This is a partial list of unnumbered minor planets for principal provisional designations assigned between 16 October and 15 November 2004. , a total of 508 bodies remain unnumbered for this period. Objects for this year are listed on the following pages: A–B · C · D–E · F · G–H · J–O · P–Q · Ri · Rii · Riii · S · Ti · Tii · Tiii · Tiv · U–V · W–X and Y. Also see previous and next year.

U 

|- id="2004 UB" bgcolor=#FFC2E0
| 2 || 2004 UB || APO || 20.5 || data-sort-value="0.28" | 280 m || multiple || 2004–2020 || 23 Nov 2020 || 145 || align=left | Disc.: LINEAR || 
|- id="2004 UE" bgcolor=#FFC2E0
| 0 || 2004 UE || APO || 21.40 || data-sort-value="0.19" | 190 m || multiple || 2004–2021 || 13 Nov 2021 || 469 || align=left | Disc.: LINEARPotentially hazardous object || 
|- id="2004 UQ" bgcolor=#fefefe
| – || 2004 UQ || HUN || 21.8 || data-sort-value="0.13" | 130 m || single || 2 days || 18 Oct 2004 || 7 || align=left | Disc.: Las Campanas Obs. || 
|- id="2004 UR" bgcolor=#FFC2E0
| 5 || 2004 UR || APO || 23.1 || data-sort-value="0.085" | 85 m || single || 49 days || 09 Nov 2004 || 67 || align=left | Disc.: LINEAR || 
|- id="2004 UZ" bgcolor=#d6d6d6
| 1 || 2004 UZ || MBA-O || 17.4 || 1.8 km || multiple || 2004–2016 || 30 Dec 2016 || 194 || align=left | Disc.: LINEARAlt.: 2010 OX91 || 
|- id="2004 UH1" bgcolor=#FFC2E0
| 7 ||  || ATE || 28.1 || data-sort-value="0.0085" | 9 m || single || 1 day || 24 Oct 2004 || 18 || align=left | Disc.: Spacewatch || 
|- id="2004 UR1" bgcolor=#FFC2E0
| 0 ||  || APO || 20.5 || data-sort-value="0.28" | 280 m || multiple || 2004–2020 || 07 Dec 2020 || 238 || align=left | Disc.: LINEARPotentially hazardous object || 
|- id="2004 US1" bgcolor=#FFC2E0
| 2 ||  || APO || 20.5 || data-sort-value="0.28" | 280 m || multiple || 2004–2021 || 05 Jan 2021 || 268 || align=left | Disc.: LINEAR || 
|- id="2004 UT1" bgcolor=#FFC2E0
| 3 ||  || ATE || 26.77 || data-sort-value="0.017" | 15 m || multiple || 2004-2022 || 19 Oct 2022 || 46 || align=left | Disc.: LINEAR || 
|- id="2004 UV1" bgcolor=#FFC2E0
| 0 ||  || APO || 17.7 || 1.0 km || multiple || 2004–2018 || 07 Sep 2018 || 193 || align=left | Disc.: SSSPotentially hazardous objectNEO larger than 1 kilometer || 
|- id="2004 UA2" bgcolor=#E9E9E9
| 0 ||  || MBA-M || 17.82 || 1.1 km || multiple || 2004–2021 || 17 Dec 2021 || 169 || align=left | Disc.: LINEARAlt.: 2008 OJ7 || 
|- id="2004 UC3" bgcolor=#E9E9E9
| 0 ||  || MBA-M || 17.00 || 1.7 km || multiple || 2004–2022 || 06 Jan 2022 || 171 || align=left | Disc.: LINEAR || 
|- id="2004 UL3" bgcolor=#E9E9E9
| – ||  || MBA-M || 17.8 || 1.2 km || single || 23 days || 02 Nov 2004 || 26 || align=left | Disc.: LINEAR || 
|- id="2004 UF5" bgcolor=#E9E9E9
| 0 ||  || MBA-M || 18.19 || data-sort-value="0.68" | 680 m || multiple || 2004–2022 || 25 Jan 2022 || 59 || align=left | Disc.: Kitt Peak Obs. || 
|- id="2004 UR5" bgcolor=#E9E9E9
| 0 ||  || MBA-M || 17.03 || 1.7 km || multiple || 2004–2021 || 03 Dec 2021 || 131 || align=left | Disc.: LINEAR || 
|- id="2004 UJ9" bgcolor=#E9E9E9
| 0 ||  || MBA-M || 17.6 || data-sort-value="0.90" | 900 m || multiple || 2004–2021 || 08 Jan 2021 || 167 || align=left | Disc.: SpacewatchAlt.: 2012 VU125, 2014 HN17, 2016 XT7 || 
|- id="2004 UL9" bgcolor=#fefefe
| E ||  || MBA-I || 19.9 || data-sort-value="0.31" | 310 m || single || 2 days || 20 Oct 2004 || 15 || align=left | Disc.: TÜBİTAK Obs. || 
|- id="2004 UB10" bgcolor=#FA8072
| 0 ||  || HUN || 18.20 || data-sort-value="0.68" | 680 m || multiple || 2004–2021 || 14 Apr 2021 || 193 || align=left | Disc.: LINEARAlt.: 2012 UN77 || 
|- id="2004 UD10" bgcolor=#C2E0FF
| 3 ||  || TNO || 6.7 || 152 km || multiple || 2004–2018 || 14 Nov 2018 || 23 || align=left | Disc.: Kitt Peak Obs.LoUTNOs, cubewano (cold) || 
|- id="2004 UE10" bgcolor=#C2E0FF
| E ||  || TNO || 7.7 || 136 km || single || 23 days || 10 Nov 2004 || 4 || align=left | Disc.: Kitt Peak Obs.LoUTNOs, plutino? || 
|- id="2004 UF10" bgcolor=#C2E0FF
| E ||  || TNO || 7.8 || 130 km || single || 23 days || 10 Nov 2004 || 5 || align=left | Disc.: Kitt Peak Obs.LoUTNOs, plutino? || 
|- id="2004 US10" bgcolor=#C2E0FF
| 3 ||  || TNO || 9.3 || 65 km || multiple || 2004–2015 || 08 Nov 2015 || 13 || align=left | Disc.: Las Campanas Obs.LoUTNOs, plutino || 
|- id="2004 UT10" bgcolor=#C2E0FF
| E ||  || TNO || 7.0 || 144 km || single || 58 days || 14 Dec 2004 || 6 || align=left | Disc.: Las Campanas Obs.LoUTNOs, twotino? || 
|- id="2004 UU10" bgcolor=#C2E0FF
| E ||  || TNO || 8.8 || 60 km || single || 58 days || 14 Dec 2004 || 6 || align=left | Disc.: Las Campanas Obs.LoUTNOs, cubewano? || 
|- id="2004 UW10" bgcolor=#C2E0FF
| E ||  || TNO || 10.5 || 38 km || single || 58 days || 14 Dec 2004 || 6 || align=left | Disc.: Las Campanas Obs.LoUTNOs, plutino? || 
|- id="2004 UL11" bgcolor=#fefefe
| 0 ||  || MBA-I || 17.95 || data-sort-value="0.76" | 760 m || multiple || 1998–2021 || 14 Apr 2021 || 117 || align=left | Disc.: Spacewatch || 
|- id="2004 UM11" bgcolor=#E9E9E9
| 0 ||  || MBA-M || 17.05 || 1.2 km || multiple || 2004–2022 || 21 Jan 2022 || 243 || align=left | Disc.: CSS || 
|- id="2004 UO11" bgcolor=#E9E9E9
| 0 ||  || MBA-M || 17.0 || 2.2 km || multiple || 2004–2020 || 15 Apr 2020 || 96 || align=left | Disc.: Spacewatch || 
|- id="2004 UR11" bgcolor=#E9E9E9
| 0 ||  || MBA-M || 17.79 || 1.2 km || multiple || 2004–2021 || 02 Dec 2021 || 126 || align=left | Disc.: Spacewatch || 
|- id="2004 UT11" bgcolor=#fefefe
| 0 ||  || MBA-I || 18.78 || data-sort-value="0.52" | 520 m || multiple || 2004–2021 || 18 Jun 2021 || 43 || align=left | Disc.: Kitt Peak Obs. || 
|- id="2004 UU11" bgcolor=#d6d6d6
| 0 ||  || MBA-O || 16.91 || 2.3 km || multiple || 2004–2022 || 25 Jan 2022 || 54 || align=left | Disc.: LPL/Spacewatch II || 
|- id="2004 UV11" bgcolor=#fefefe
| 0 ||  || MBA-I || 18.97 || data-sort-value="0.48" | 480 m || multiple || 2004–2021 || 17 Jun 2021 || 33 || align=left | Disc.: Kitt Peak Obs. || 
|- id="2004 UW11" bgcolor=#E9E9E9
| 0 ||  || MBA-M || 17.96 || data-sort-value="0.76" | 760 m || multiple || 2004–2022 || 25 Jan 2022 || 65 || align=left | Disc.: SpacewatchAlt.: 2010 LL156 || 
|- id="2004 UX11" bgcolor=#d6d6d6
| 0 ||  || MBA-O || 17.1 || 2.1 km || multiple || 2004–2018 || 15 Sep 2018 || 50 || align=left | Disc.: Spacewatch || 
|- id="2004 UY11" bgcolor=#E9E9E9
| 0 ||  || MBA-M || 17.72 || 1.2 km || multiple || 1995–2021 || 28 Sep 2021 || 104 || align=left | Disc.: Kitt Peak Obs. || 
|- id="2004 UZ11" bgcolor=#E9E9E9
| 0 ||  || MBA-M || 17.93 || 1.4 km || multiple || 2004–2021 || 08 Aug 2021 || 36 || align=left | Disc.: Kitt Peak Obs. || 
|- id="2004 UA12" bgcolor=#fefefe
| 4 ||  || MBA-I || 18.5 || data-sort-value="0.59" | 590 m || multiple || 2004–2019 || 02 Nov 2019 || 27 || align=left | Disc.: Spacewatch || 
|- id="2004 UB12" bgcolor=#fefefe
| 1 ||  || MBA-I || 18.1 || data-sort-value="0.71" | 710 m || multiple || 2004–2019 || 27 Oct 2019 || 61 || align=left | Disc.: Kitt Peak Obs.Alt.: 2010 LT124 || 
|- id="2004 UC12" bgcolor=#E9E9E9
| 0 ||  || MBA-M || 17.94 || 1.1 km || multiple || 2004–2021 || 06 Nov 2021 || 69 || align=left | Disc.: SpacewatchAdded on 22 July 2020 || 
|- id="2004 UE12" bgcolor=#d6d6d6
| 0 ||  || MBA-O || 17.2 || 2.0 km || multiple || 1998–2020 || 15 Oct 2020 || 78 || align=left | Disc.: Kitt Peak Obs.Added on 19 October 2020 || 
|- id="2004 UG12" bgcolor=#fefefe
| 0 ||  || MBA-I || 19.2 || data-sort-value="0.43" | 430 m || multiple || 2004–2020 || 15 Oct 2020 || 30 || align=left | Disc.: Kitt Peak Obs.Added on 17 January 2021 || 
|- id="2004 UH12" bgcolor=#fefefe
| 0 ||  || MBA-I || 19.13 || data-sort-value="0.44" | 440 m || multiple || 2004–2021 || 02 Dec 2021 || 57 || align=left | Disc.: SpacewatchAdded on 5 November 2021 || 
|- id="2004 UJ12" bgcolor=#E9E9E9
| 0 ||  || MBA-M || 18.4 || 1.2 km || multiple || 2004–2019 || 03 Apr 2019 || 29 || align=left | Disc.: SpacewatchAdded on 29 January 2022 || 
|}
back to top

V 

|- id="2004 VP" bgcolor=#FFC2E0
| 0 || 2004 VP || APO || 22.14 || data-sort-value="0.13" | 130 m || multiple || 2004–2021 || 01 Nov 2021 || 111 || align=left | Disc.: Spacewatch || 
|- id="2004 VW" bgcolor=#FFC2E0
| 8 || 2004 VW || APO || 23.1 || data-sort-value="0.085" | 85 m || single || 3 days || 06 Nov 2004 || 31 || align=left | Disc.: CSS || 
|- id="2004 VZ" bgcolor=#FFC2E0
| 7 || 2004 VZ || ATE || 24.6 || data-sort-value="0.043" | 43 m || single || 4 days || 06 Nov 2004 || 46 || align=left | Disc.: LINEAR || 
|- id="2004 VH1" bgcolor=#FFC2E0
| 8 ||  || APO || 21.8 || data-sort-value="0.16" | 160 m || single || 17 days || 21 Nov 2004 || 36 || align=left | Disc.: CSS || 
|- id="2004 VJ1" bgcolor=#FFC2E0
| 4 ||  || ATE || 24.1 || data-sort-value="0.054" | 54 m || multiple || 2004–2015 || 09 Dec 2015 || 98 || align=left | Disc.: CSS || 
|- id="2004 VK1" bgcolor=#d6d6d6
| 0 ||  || MBA-O || 15.73 || 4.0 km || multiple || 2004–2022 || 25 Jan 2022 || 281 || align=left | Disc.: LONEOS || 
|- id="2004 VQ2" bgcolor=#d6d6d6
| 2 ||  || MBA-O || 17.3 || 1.9 km || multiple || 2004–2021 || 11 Jan 2021 || 96 || align=left | Disc.: SpacewatchAlt.: 2020 QZ47 || 
|- id="2004 VU2" bgcolor=#fefefe
| 0 ||  || MBA-I || 17.83 || data-sort-value="0.81" | 810 m || multiple || 2004–2021 || 06 Apr 2021 || 61 || align=left | Disc.: SpacewatchAlt.: 2015 XK71 || 
|- id="2004 VR3" bgcolor=#d6d6d6
| 0 ||  || HIL || 15.7 || 4.0 km || multiple || 2003–2021 || 09 Jan 2021 || 130 || align=left | Disc.: SpacewatchAlt.: 2012 WH10 || 
|- id="2004 VM4" bgcolor=#E9E9E9
| 1 ||  || MBA-M || 18.46 || data-sort-value="0.85" | 850 m || multiple || 2004–2021 || 30 Nov 2021 || 94 || align=left | Disc.: SpacewatchAdded on 21 August 2021 || 
|- id="2004 VW5" bgcolor=#E9E9E9
| 0 ||  || MBA-M || 16.71 || 2.5 km || multiple || 2004–2021 || 11 Jun 2021 || 153 || align=left | Disc.: Spacewatch || 
|- id="2004 VJ9" bgcolor=#E9E9E9
| 0 ||  || MBA-M || 17.16 || 1.1 km || multiple || 1993–2022 || 22 Jan 2022 || 119 || align=left | Disc.: CSS || 
|- id="2004 VF11" bgcolor=#d6d6d6
| 0 ||  || MBA-O || 16.76 || 2.5 km || multiple || 2004–2021 || 27 Dec 2021 || 213 || align=left | Disc.: NEATAlt.: 2014 KB9 || 
|- id="2004 VJ11" bgcolor=#E9E9E9
| 2 ||  || MBA-M || 17.8 || 1.5 km || multiple || 2004–2019 || 03 Jan 2019 || 108 || align=left | Disc.: NEATAlt.: 2010 GD194, 2018 UM4 || 
|- id="2004 VP11" bgcolor=#E9E9E9
| 0 ||  || MBA-M || 16.61 || 2.7 km || multiple || 2004–2021 || 30 Jun 2021 || 194 || align=left | Disc.: NEAT || 
|- id="2004 VT11" bgcolor=#d6d6d6
| 0 ||  || MBA-O || 16.08 || 3.4 km || multiple || 2004–2021 || 03 Dec 2021 || 539 || align=left | Disc.: CSS || 
|- id="2004 VY14" bgcolor=#FFC2E0
| 1 ||  || APO || 19.7 || data-sort-value="0.41" | 410 m || multiple || 2004–2015 || 14 Nov 2015 || 75 || align=left | Disc.: CSSAlt.: 2015 DA199 || 
|- id="2004 VZ14" bgcolor=#FFC2E0
| 8 ||  || APO || 25.3 || data-sort-value="0.031" | 31 m || single || 9 days || 13 Nov 2004 || 37 || align=left | Disc.: CSS || 
|- id="2004 VD15" bgcolor=#d6d6d6
| – ||  || MBA-O || 16.8 || 2.4 km || single || 35 days || 19 Nov 2004 || 21 || align=left | Disc.: Astronomical Research Obs. || 
|- id="2004 VA17" bgcolor=#FA8072
| – ||  || MCA || 21.9 || data-sort-value="0.12" | 120 m || single || 4 days || 08 Nov 2004 || 13 || align=left | Disc.: Spacewatch || 
|- id="2004 VH17" bgcolor=#fefefe
| 0 ||  || MBA-I || 17.9 || data-sort-value="0.78" | 780 m || multiple || 2004–2020 || 28 Jan 2020 || 132 || align=left | Disc.: SpacewatchAlt.: 2015 RH123 || 
|- id="2004 VR17" bgcolor=#E9E9E9
| 0 ||  || MBA-M || 18.66 || data-sort-value="0.78" | 780 m || multiple || 2004–2021 || 08 Dec 2021 || 31 || align=left | Disc.: NEATAdded on 21 August 2021 || 
|- id="2004 VC18" bgcolor=#E9E9E9
| 1 ||  || MBA-M || 17.9 || 1.5 km || multiple || 2003–2018 || 15 Nov 2018 || 55 || align=left | Disc.: SpacewatchAlt.: 2018 TB31 || 
|- id="2004 VZ20" bgcolor=#E9E9E9
| 0 ||  || MBA-M || 18.23 || data-sort-value="0.95" | 950 m || multiple || 2004–2021 || 27 Dec 2021 || 47 || align=left | Disc.: CSS || 
|- id="2004 VC21" bgcolor=#fefefe
| 0 ||  || MBA-I || 17.80 || data-sort-value="0.82" | 820 m || multiple || 2000–2021 || 15 Apr 2021 || 175 || align=left | Disc.: CSS || 
|- id="2004 VM24" bgcolor=#FFC2E0
| 5 ||  || APO || 25.7 || data-sort-value="0.026" | 26 m || single || 3 days || 12 Nov 2004 || 129 || align=left | Disc.: CSS || 
|- id="2004 VO26" bgcolor=#FA8072
| 1 ||  || MCA || 18.7 || data-sort-value="0.54" | 540 m || multiple || 2004–2021 || 09 Jan 2021 || 101 || align=left | Disc.: CSSAdded on 17 January 2021 || 
|- id="2004 VU27" bgcolor=#E9E9E9
| 0 ||  || MBA-M || 17.52 || 1.3 km || multiple || 2004–2021 || 16 Nov 2021 || 33 || align=left | Disc.: NEAT || 
|- id="2004 VP30" bgcolor=#E9E9E9
| 0 ||  || MBA-M || 17.82 || 1.1 km || multiple || 2003–2021 || 29 Sep 2021 || 84 || align=left | Disc.: SpacewatchAlt.: 2008 RA48 || 
|- id="2004 VS31" bgcolor=#E9E9E9
| 1 ||  || MBA-M || 16.8 || 2.4 km || multiple || 2004–2020 || 25 Mar 2020 || 58 || align=left | Disc.: Spacewatch || 
|- id="2004 VC32" bgcolor=#d6d6d6
| 0 ||  || MBA-O || 17.16 || 2.1 km || multiple || 2004–2021 || 09 Dec 2021 || 60 || align=left | Disc.: Spacewatch || 
|- id="2004 VD32" bgcolor=#d6d6d6
| 1 ||  || MBA-O || 17.28 || 1.9 km || multiple || 2004–2021 || 24 Nov 2021 || 60 || align=left | Disc.: SpacewatchAdded on 24 December 2021 || 
|- id="2004 VS32" bgcolor=#E9E9E9
| 0 ||  || MBA-M || 17.30 || 1.0 km || multiple || 2004–2022 || 13 Jan 2022 || 145 || align=left | Disc.: SpacewatchAlt.: 2010 EC109, 2015 PX133 || 
|- id="2004 VF33" bgcolor=#fefefe
| 0 ||  || MBA-I || 18.2 || data-sort-value="0.68" | 680 m || multiple || 2004–2021 || 14 Apr 2021 || 43 || align=left | Disc.: SpacewatchAlt.: 2014 HH220 || 
|- id="2004 VH33" bgcolor=#E9E9E9
| 0 ||  || MBA-M || 17.47 || 1.3 km || multiple || 1997–2021 || 02 Dec 2021 || 145 || align=left | Disc.: SpacewatchAlt.: 2005 XD110, 2010 CW153 || 
|- id="2004 VN33" bgcolor=#d6d6d6
| 0 ||  || MBA-O || 16.5 || 2.8 km || multiple || 2004–2020 || 15 Sep 2020 || 70 || align=left | Disc.: SpacewatchAlt.: 2015 TU173 || 
|- id="2004 VP33" bgcolor=#E9E9E9
| 0 ||  || MBA-M || 18.25 || data-sort-value="0.94" | 940 m || multiple || 2004–2021 || 27 Nov 2021 || 66 || align=left | Disc.: SpacewatchAdded on 5 November 2021 || 
|- id="2004 VW33" bgcolor=#fefefe
| 1 ||  || MBA-I || 18.3 || data-sort-value="0.65" | 650 m || multiple || 2004–2019 || 20 Dec 2019 || 35 || align=left | Disc.: Spacewatch || 
|- id="2004 VL34" bgcolor=#d6d6d6
| 0 ||  || MBA-O || 16.8 || 2.4 km || multiple || 2004–2021 || 06 Jan 2021 || 55 || align=left | Disc.: SpacewatchAdded on 22 July 2020 || 
|- id="2004 VN34" bgcolor=#d6d6d6
| 0 ||  || MBA-O || 17.0 || 2.2 km || multiple || 2004–2020 || 15 Nov 2020 || 77 || align=left | Disc.: SpacewatchAlt.: 2009 SU114 || 
|- id="2004 VV34" bgcolor=#E9E9E9
| 3 ||  || MBA-M || 17.9 || 1.5 km || multiple || 2004–2018 || 17 Nov 2018 || 24 || align=left | Disc.: SpacewatchAdded on 19 October 2020 || 
|- id="2004 VZ34" bgcolor=#E9E9E9
| 1 ||  || MBA-M || 18.8 || data-sort-value="0.52" | 520 m || multiple || 2004–2020 || 14 Sep 2020 || 48 || align=left | Disc.: SpacewatchAdded on 19 October 2020 || 
|- id="2004 VG35" bgcolor=#d6d6d6
| 0 ||  || MBA-O || 17.5 || 1.8 km || multiple || 2004–2020 || 17 Oct 2020 || 62 || align=left | Disc.: Spacewatch || 
|- id="2004 VH35" bgcolor=#E9E9E9
| 0 ||  || MBA-M || 17.93 || 1.1 km || multiple || 2003–2021 || 30 Nov 2021 || 81 || align=left | Disc.: Spacewatch || 
|- id="2004 VJ36" bgcolor=#fefefe
| 0 ||  || MBA-I || 18.95 || data-sort-value="0.48" | 480 m || multiple || 2002–2021 || 12 May 2021 || 35 || align=left | Disc.: SpacewatchAdded on 17 June 2021 || 
|- id="2004 VV36" bgcolor=#fefefe
| 1 ||  || HUN || 18.9 || data-sort-value="0.49" | 490 m || multiple || 2004–2021 || 05 Jan 2021 || 73 || align=left | Disc.: Spacewatch || 
|- id="2004 VA37" bgcolor=#d6d6d6
| 0 ||  || HIL || 16.2 || 3.2 km || multiple || 2004–2021 || 18 Jan 2021 || 84 || align=left | Disc.: Spacewatch || 
|- id="2004 VN37" bgcolor=#fefefe
| 1 ||  || MBA-I || 18.3 || data-sort-value="0.65" | 650 m || multiple || 2004–2021 || 11 Jun 2021 || 56 || align=left | Disc.: SpacewatchAlt.: 2011 SY119 || 
|- id="2004 VN38" bgcolor=#fefefe
| 4 ||  || MBA-I || 19.8 || data-sort-value="0.33" | 330 m || multiple || 2004–2020 || 23 Nov 2020 || 24 || align=left | Disc.: Spacewatch || 
|- id="2004 VS38" bgcolor=#E9E9E9
| – ||  || MBA-M || 19.4 || data-sort-value="0.55" | 550 m || single || 7 days || 11 Nov 2004 || 9 || align=left | Disc.: Spacewatch || 
|- id="2004 VY38" bgcolor=#fefefe
| 2 ||  || MBA-I || 18.3 || data-sort-value="0.65" | 650 m || multiple || 2004–2019 || 19 Nov 2019 || 56 || align=left | Disc.: Spacewatch || 
|- id="2004 VJ39" bgcolor=#fefefe
| 1 ||  || MBA-I || 18.0 || data-sort-value="0.75" | 750 m || multiple || 2004–2019 || 03 Jan 2019 || 70 || align=left | Disc.: Spacewatch || 
|- id="2004 VK39" bgcolor=#E9E9E9
| 0 ||  || MBA-M || 17.87 || 1.1 km || multiple || 2004–2021 || 10 Nov 2021 || 76 || align=left | Disc.: Spacewatch || 
|- id="2004 VL39" bgcolor=#fefefe
| 3 ||  || MBA-I || 18.9 || data-sort-value="0.49" | 490 m || multiple || 2004–2019 || 03 Dec 2019 || 32 || align=left | Disc.: Spacewatch || 
|- id="2004 VM39" bgcolor=#d6d6d6
| – ||  || MBA-O || 18.4 || 1.2 km || single || 16 days || 20 Nov 2004 || 11 || align=left | Disc.: Spacewatch || 
|- id="2004 VT39" bgcolor=#d6d6d6
| – ||  || MBA-O || 17.3 || 1.9 km || single || 16 days || 20 Nov 2004 || 11 || align=left | Disc.: Spacewatch || 
|- id="2004 VM40" bgcolor=#E9E9E9
| 0 ||  || MBA-M || 16.8 || 2.4 km || multiple || 1995–2021 || 11 Jun 2021 || 119 || align=left | Disc.: SpacewatchAlt.: 2012 JC65, 2017 UN3 || 
|- id="2004 VZ40" bgcolor=#d6d6d6
| 2 ||  || MBA-O || 17.7 || 1.6 km || multiple || 2004–2020 || 15 Oct 2020 || 42 || align=left | Disc.: SpacewatchAdded on 9 March 2021Alt.: 2020 QV34 || 
|- id="2004 VX41" bgcolor=#E9E9E9
| 1 ||  || MBA-M || 17.5 || 1.8 km || multiple || 2004–2020 || 27 Apr 2020 || 60 || align=left | Disc.: SpacewatchAlt.: 2010 HE8 || 
|- id="2004 VY41" bgcolor=#d6d6d6
| 0 ||  || MBA-O || 17.4 || 1.8 km || multiple || 2004–2020 || 07 Dec 2020 || 99 || align=left | Disc.: SpacewatchAlt.: 2014 OP132, 2015 XB198 || 
|- id="2004 VD42" bgcolor=#fefefe
| 0 ||  || MBA-I || 18.2 || data-sort-value="0.68" | 680 m || multiple || 2004–2020 || 01 Feb 2020 || 80 || align=left | Disc.: SpacewatchAlt.: 2015 XS192 || 
|- id="2004 VJ42" bgcolor=#fefefe
| 0 ||  || MBA-I || 18.4 || data-sort-value="0.62" | 620 m || multiple || 2004–2019 || 24 Oct 2019 || 55 || align=left | Disc.: Spacewatch || 
|- id="2004 VL42" bgcolor=#d6d6d6
| 0 ||  || MBA-O || 16.53 || 2.8 km || multiple || 2002–2022 || 24 Jan 2022 || 119 || align=left | Disc.: Spacewatch || 
|- id="2004 VW42" bgcolor=#d6d6d6
| 0 ||  || MBA-O || 17.0 || 2.2 km || multiple || 2004–2020 || 16 Oct 2020 || 106 || align=left | Disc.: Spacewatch || 
|- id="2004 VY42" bgcolor=#fefefe
| 2 ||  || MBA-I || 18.9 || data-sort-value="0.49" | 490 m || multiple || 2000–2021 || 13 Feb 2021 || 29 || align=left | Disc.: SpacewatchAdded on 9 March 2021 || 
|- id="2004 VZ42" bgcolor=#d6d6d6
| 3 ||  || MBA-O || 17.52 || 1.7 km || multiple || 2004–2021 || 30 Nov 2021 || 40 || align=left | Disc.: SpacewatchAdded on 24 December 2021 || 
|- id="2004 VD43" bgcolor=#d6d6d6
| 0 ||  || MBA-O || 17.1 || 2.1 km || multiple || 2004–2020 || 17 Dec 2020 || 46 || align=left | Disc.: Spacewatch || 
|- id="2004 VD44" bgcolor=#fefefe
| 0 ||  || MBA-I || 18.23 || data-sort-value="0.67" | 670 m || multiple || 1998–2021 || 10 Apr 2021 || 76 || align=left | Disc.: SpacewatchAlt.: 2008 YN116 || 
|- id="2004 VK44" bgcolor=#E9E9E9
| 3 ||  || MBA-M || 17.7 || 1.6 km || multiple || 2004–2018 || 13 Dec 2018 || 38 || align=left | Disc.: SpacewatchAlt.: 2018 VQ80 || 
|- id="2004 VR44" bgcolor=#d6d6d6
| 0 ||  || MBA-O || 16.78 || 2.5 km || multiple || 2004–2021 || 10 May 2021 || 95 || align=left | Disc.: Spacewatch || 
|- id="2004 VZ44" bgcolor=#fefefe
| 0 ||  || MBA-I || 18.5 || data-sort-value="0.59" | 590 m || multiple || 2000–2019 || 24 Oct 2019 || 46 || align=left | Disc.: SpacewatchAlt.: 2015 QZ1 || 
|- id="2004 VY45" bgcolor=#E9E9E9
| 0 ||  || MBA-M || 17.86 || 1.1 km || multiple || 2004–2021 || 09 Dec 2021 || 56 || align=left | Disc.: SpacewatchAdded on 22 July 2020 || 
|- id="2004 VC46" bgcolor=#E9E9E9
| 0 ||  || MBA-M || 17.25 || 1.5 km || multiple || 2004–2021 || 01 Nov 2021 || 114 || align=left | Disc.: Spacewatch || 
|- id="2004 VJ46" bgcolor=#E9E9E9
| 0 ||  || MBA-M || 18.08 || 1.0 km || multiple || 2004–2022 || 06 Jan 2022 || 48 || align=left | Disc.: SpacewatchAdded on 21 August 2021 || 
|- id="2004 VL46" bgcolor=#fefefe
| 0 ||  || MBA-I || 18.7 || data-sort-value="0.54" | 540 m || multiple || 2004–2020 || 08 Nov 2020 || 97 || align=left | Disc.: Spacewatch || 
|- id="2004 VN47" bgcolor=#fefefe
| 0 ||  || MBA-I || 19.30 || data-sort-value="0.41" | 410 m || multiple || 2004–2021 || 24 Nov 2021 || 68 || align=left | Disc.: SpacewatchAdded on 5 November 2021Alt.: 2014 RC2 || 
|- id="2004 VC48" bgcolor=#fefefe
| 0 ||  || MBA-I || 18.60 || data-sort-value="0.57" | 570 m || multiple || 2002–2021 || 05 Aug 2021 || 42 || align=left | Disc.: SpacewatchAdded on 22 July 2020 || 
|- id="2004 VP48" bgcolor=#E9E9E9
| 0 ||  || MBA-M || 16.94 || 1.2 km || multiple || 2004–2022 || 25 Jan 2022 || 149 || align=left | Disc.: SpacewatchAlt.: 2015 LF36, 2016 US76 || 
|- id="2004 VB49" bgcolor=#fefefe
| 0 ||  || MBA-I || 17.4 || data-sort-value="0.98" | 980 m || multiple || 2004–2021 || 17 Jan 2021 || 99 || align=left | Disc.: Spacewatch || 
|- id="2004 VL49" bgcolor=#E9E9E9
| 1 ||  || MBA-M || 17.9 || 1.5 km || multiple || 2004–2017 || 13 Sep 2017 || 26 || align=left | Disc.: SpacewatchAdded on 22 July 2020 || 
|- id="2004 VP49" bgcolor=#E9E9E9
| 2 ||  || MBA-M || 18.0 || 1.4 km || multiple || 2004–2019 || 08 Jan 2019 || 21 || align=left | Disc.: SpacewatchAdded on 24 December 2021 || 
|- id="2004 VS49" bgcolor=#E9E9E9
| 3 ||  || MBA-M || 18.3 || data-sort-value="0.65" | 650 m || multiple || 2004–2020 || 11 Dec 2020 || 99 || align=left | Disc.: SpacewatchAlt.: 2008 VG37, 2016 TO64 || 
|- id="2004 VA50" bgcolor=#E9E9E9
| 0 ||  || MBA-M || 17.32 || 1.9 km || multiple || 2004–2021 || 11 Apr 2021 || 71 || align=left | Disc.: Spacewatch || 
|- id="2004 VE50" bgcolor=#E9E9E9
| 1 ||  || MBA-M || 17.84 || 1.1 km || multiple || 2004–2021 || 08 Sep 2021 || 45 || align=left | Disc.: Spacewatch || 
|- id="2004 VH50" bgcolor=#E9E9E9
| 0 ||  || MBA-M || 17.59 || 1.3 km || multiple || 2004–2021 || 10 Nov 2021 || 102 || align=left | Disc.: SpacewatchAdded on 22 July 2020Alt.: 2010 CM75 || 
|- id="2004 VX50" bgcolor=#fefefe
| 5 ||  || MBA-I || 18.8 || data-sort-value="0.52" | 520 m || multiple || 2004–2019 || 08 Nov 2019 || 18 || align=left | Disc.: <SpacewatchAdded on 17 January 2021 || 
|- id="2004 VU51" bgcolor=#fefefe
| 0 ||  || MBA-I || 17.5 || data-sort-value="0.94" | 940 m || multiple || 2004–2021 || 09 Aug 2021 || 65 || align=left | Disc.: SpacewatchAdded on 24 December 2021 || 
|- id="2004 VB52" bgcolor=#d6d6d6
| 0 ||  || MBA-O || 15.7 || 4.0 km || multiple || 2004–2021 || 16 Jan 2021 || 169 || align=left | Disc.: CSS || 
|- id="2004 VS52" bgcolor=#E9E9E9
| 0 ||  || MBA-M || 16.33 || 3.0 km || multiple || 2001–2021 || 09 Jul 2021 || 197 || align=left | Disc.: CSSAlt.: 2009 XU21, 2010 FY130, 2018 XD13 || 
|- id="2004 VT55" bgcolor=#d6d6d6
| 0 ||  || MBA-O || 17.2 || 2.0 km || multiple || 2001–2021 || 06 Jan 2021 || 64 || align=left | Disc.: SpacewatchAdded on 17 January 2021 || 
|- id="2004 VZ55" bgcolor=#E9E9E9
| 1 ||  || MBA-M || 18.20 || data-sort-value="0.96" | 960 m || multiple || 2004–2021 || 09 Aug 2021 || 23 || align=left | Disc.: Spacewatch || 
|- id="2004 VB56" bgcolor=#fefefe
| 0 ||  || MBA-I || 18.02 || data-sort-value="0.74" | 740 m || multiple || 2000–2021 || 04 May 2021 || 93 || align=left | Disc.: Spacewatch || 
|- id="2004 VP58" bgcolor=#E9E9E9
| 0 ||  || MBA-M || 17.3 || 1.9 km || multiple || 2004–2020 || 27 Apr 2020 || 75 || align=left | Disc.: CSSAlt.: 2010 HD26 || 
|- id="2004 VT58" bgcolor=#d6d6d6
| 0 ||  || MBA-O || 16.48 || 2.8 km || multiple || 2001–2022 || 24 Jan 2022 || 131 || align=left | Disc.: CSSAlt.: 2014 RY30, 2016 AL89 || 
|- id="2004 VZ60" bgcolor=#FFC2E0
| 6 ||  || AMO || 24.8 || data-sort-value="0.039" | 39 m || single || 40 days || 14 Dec 2004 || 32 || align=left | Disc.: CSS || 
|- id="2004 VB61" bgcolor=#FFC2E0
| 1 ||  || AMO || 22.1 || data-sort-value="0.14" | 140 m || multiple || 2004–2019 || 03 Jan 2019 || 51 || align=left | Disc.: LINEAR || 
|- id="2004 VQ63" bgcolor=#FA8072
| 0 ||  || MCA || 18.13 || data-sort-value="0.70" | 700 m || multiple || 2004–2021 || 02 Jun 2021 || 108 || align=left | Disc.: LINEAR || 
|- id="2004 VQ65" bgcolor=#FFC2E0
| 5 ||  || APO || 22.3 || data-sort-value="0.12" | 120 m || single || 18 days || 02 Dec 2004 || 36 || align=left | Disc.: CSS || 
|- id="2004 VY65" bgcolor=#fefefe
| 0 ||  || MBA-I || 17.1 || 1.1 km || multiple || 2002–2020 || 01 Feb 2020 || 162 || align=left | Disc.: SpacewatchAlt.: 2011 SU132, 2014 RF31 || 
|- id="2004 VF66" bgcolor=#E9E9E9
| 0 ||  || MBA-M || 18.32 || data-sort-value="0.91" | 910 m || multiple || 2004–2021 || 27 Oct 2021 || 77 || align=left | Disc.: Spacewatch || 
|- id="2004 VH66" bgcolor=#fefefe
| 1 ||  || MBA-I || 18.6 || data-sort-value="0.57" | 570 m || multiple || 2004–2018 || 06 Oct 2018 || 32 || align=left | Disc.: SpacewatchAdded on 22 July 2020 || 
|- id="2004 VK66" bgcolor=#E9E9E9
| 0 ||  || MBA-M || 18.28 || data-sort-value="0.93" | 930 m || multiple || 2004–2021 || 31 Aug 2021 || 30 || align=left | Disc.: Spacewatch || 
|- id="2004 VB67" bgcolor=#d6d6d6
| 0 ||  || MBA-O || 16.8 || 2.4 km || multiple || 2004–2020 || 15 Dec 2020 || 78 || align=left | Disc.: Kitt Peak Obs.Alt.: 2014 QZ73 || 
|- id="2004 VC67" bgcolor=#E9E9E9
| 0 ||  || MBA-M || 17.41 || 1.8 km || multiple || 2004–2021 || 09 Jul 2021 || 48 || align=left | Disc.: Kitt Peak Obs. || 
|- id="2004 VH67" bgcolor=#fefefe
| 0 ||  || MBA-I || 18.09 || data-sort-value="0.72" | 720 m || multiple || 2000–2021 || 09 Apr 2021 || 85 || align=left | Disc.: Kitt Peak Obs.Alt.: 2014 HQ19, 2015 TN99 || 
|- id="2004 VJ67" bgcolor=#d6d6d6
| 0 ||  || MBA-O || 16.8 || 2.4 km || multiple || 2004–2021 || 17 Jan 2021 || 135 || align=left | Disc.: Kitt Peak Obs.Alt.: 2014 TH36, 2016 BF23 || 
|- id="2004 VQ67" bgcolor=#E9E9E9
| 0 ||  || MBA-M || 17.9 || 1.5 km || multiple || 2004–2020 || 26 Apr 2020 || 38 || align=left | Disc.: Kitt Peak Obs.Added on 22 July 2020 || 
|- id="2004 VT67" bgcolor=#d6d6d6
| 0 ||  || MBA-O || 17.83 || 1.5 km || multiple || 2004–2021 || 07 Nov 2021 || 55 || align=left | Disc.: Kitt Peak Obs.Alt.: 2015 TU295 || 
|- id="2004 VX67" bgcolor=#E9E9E9
| 0 ||  || MBA-M || 18.10 || 1.3 km || multiple || 2004–2021 || 08 May 2021 || 45 || align=left | Disc.: Kitt Peak Obs.Added on 22 July 2020 || 
|- id="2004 VZ67" bgcolor=#d6d6d6
| 0 ||  || MBA-O || 16.88 || 2.3 km || multiple || 2004–2021 || 13 Oct 2021 || 58 || align=left | Disc.: Kitt Peak Obs. || 
|- id="2004 VA68" bgcolor=#E9E9E9
| 0 ||  || MBA-M || 18.31 || data-sort-value="0.92" | 920 m || multiple || 1995–2021 || 04 Oct 2021 || 58 || align=left | Disc.: Kitt Peak Obs. || 
|- id="2004 VE68" bgcolor=#fefefe
| 0 ||  || HUN || 18.5 || data-sort-value="0.59" | 590 m || multiple || 2004–2020 || 17 Oct 2020 || 46 || align=left | Disc.: SpacewatchAlt.: 2011 HE4 || 
|- id="2004 VF68" bgcolor=#E9E9E9
| 0 ||  || MBA-M || 17.22 || 1.5 km || multiple || 2004–2021 || 31 Oct 2021 || 72 || align=left | Disc.: Spacewatch || 
|- id="2004 VJ68" bgcolor=#E9E9E9
| 0 ||  || MBA-M || 18.39 || data-sort-value="0.62" | 620 m || multiple || 2004–2022 || 27 Jan 2022 || 38 || align=left | Disc.: SpacewatchAdded on 24 December 2021 || 
|- id="2004 VO68" bgcolor=#d6d6d6
| 0 ||  || MBA-O || 16.95 || 2.3 km || multiple || 1996–2021 || 08 May 2021 || 141 || align=left | Disc.: SpacewatchAlt.: 1996 AG9 || 
|- id="2004 VR68" bgcolor=#d6d6d6
| 1 ||  || MBA-O || 17.70 || 1.6 km || multiple || 2004–2021 || 02 Dec 2021 || 57 || align=left | Disc.: Spacewatch || 
|- id="2004 VA69" bgcolor=#d6d6d6
| 4 ||  || MBA-O || 16.1 || 3.4 km || multiple || 2004–2014 || 24 Apr 2014 || 13 || align=left | Disc.: Spacewatch || 
|- id="2004 VD69" bgcolor=#d6d6d6
| 0 ||  || MBA-O || 16.7 || 2.5 km || multiple || 2004–2020 || 12 Dec 2020 || 99 || align=left | Disc.: SpacewatchAlt.: 2010 AP89 || 
|- id="2004 VP69" bgcolor=#fefefe
| 1 ||  || MBA-I || 18.2 || data-sort-value="0.68" | 680 m || multiple || 2004–2017 || 28 Jan 2017 || 30 || align=left | Disc.: Kitt Peak Obs. || 
|- id="2004 VR69" bgcolor=#d6d6d6
| 0 ||  || HIL || 15.3 || 4.8 km || multiple || 2004–2021 || 07 Jan 2021 || 134 || align=left | Disc.: Ottmarsheim || 
|- id="2004 VG70" bgcolor=#E9E9E9
| 1 ||  || MBA-M || 18.31 || 1.2 km || multiple || 2004–2018 || 12 Dec 2018 || 65 || align=left | Disc.: LONEOSAlt.: 2018 UJ19 || 
|- id="2004 VR71" bgcolor=#fefefe
| 1 ||  || HUN || 19.19 || data-sort-value="0.43" | 430 m || multiple || 2004–2021 || 01 Dec 2021 || 33 || align=left | Disc.: Spacewatch || 
|- id="2004 VV74" bgcolor=#FA8072
| 2 ||  || HUN || 18.6 || data-sort-value="0.57" | 570 m || multiple || 1999–2019 || 20 Dec 2019 || 199 || align=left | Disc.: LINEARAlt.: 1999 VM191 || 
|- id="2004 VK75" bgcolor=#fefefe
| 0 ||  || HUN || 18.66 || data-sort-value="0.55" | 550 m || multiple || 2004–2021 || 12 May 2021 || 82 || align=left | Disc.: SpacewatchAlt.: 2011 KV13 || 
|- id="2004 VU75" bgcolor=#C2E0FF
| 2 ||  || TNO || 6.7 || 157 km || multiple || 2004–2013 || 06 Oct 2013 || 20 || align=left | Disc.: Kitt Peak Obs.LoUTNOs, cubewano?, contact || 
|- id="2004 VV75" bgcolor=#C2E0FF
| E ||  || TNO || 8.7 || 86 km || single || 9 days || 18 Nov 2004 || 5 || align=left | Disc.: Kitt Peak Obs.LoUTNOs, plutino? || 
|- id="2004 VW75" bgcolor=#C2E0FF
| E ||  || TNO || 8.7 || 86 km || single || 1 day || 10 Nov 2004 || 3 || align=left | Disc.: Kitt Peak Obs.LoUTNOs, plutino? || 
|- id="2004 VX75" bgcolor=#C2E0FF
| E ||  || TNO || 7.1 || 158 km || single || 1 day || 10 Nov 2004 || 3 || align=left | Disc.: Kitt Peak Obs.LoUTNOs, other TNO || 
|- id="2004 VY75" bgcolor=#C2E0FF
| E ||  || TNO || 6.9 || 143 km || single || 1 day || 10 Nov 2004 || 3 || align=left | Disc.: Kitt Peak Obs.LoUTNOs, cubewano? || 
|- id="2004 VZ75" bgcolor=#C2E0FF
| 2 ||  || TNO || 6.4 || 248 km || multiple || 2003–2019 || 08 Feb 2019 || 25 || align=left | Disc.: Kitt Peak Obs.LoUTNOs, plutino || 
|- id="2004 VA76" bgcolor=#C2E0FF
| E ||  || TNO || 6.8 || 150 km || single || 2 days || 11 Nov 2004 || 3 || align=left | Disc.: Kitt Peak Obs.LoUTNOs, cubewano? || 
|- id="2004 VA78" bgcolor=#E9E9E9
| 0 ||  || MBA-M || 18.57 || data-sort-value="0.81" | 810 m || multiple || 2004–2021 || 30 Nov 2021 || 70 || align=left | Disc.: LPL/Spacewatch IIAdded on 5 November 2021Alt.: 2008 RO53 || 
|- id="2004 VD78" bgcolor=#E9E9E9
| 1 ||  || MBA-M || 17.3 || 1.9 km || multiple || 2004–2021 || 11 Jun 2021 || 40 || align=left | Disc.: Cordell-Lorenz Obs.Added on 21 August 2021Alt.: 2013 UN45 || 
|- id="2004 VK78" bgcolor=#C2E0FF
| 3 ||  || TNO || 7.92 || 94 km || multiple || 2004–2020 || 09 Dec 2020 || 27 || align=left | Disc.: Kitt Peak Obs.LoUTNOs, twotino || 
|- id="2004 VL78" bgcolor=#C2E0FF
| E ||  || TNO || 8.2 || 108 km || single || 7 days || 18 Nov 2004 || 4 || align=left | Disc.: Kitt Peak Obs.LoUTNOs, plutino? || 
|- id="2004 VM78" bgcolor=#C2E0FF
| E ||  || TNO || 6.9 || 173 km || single || 7 days || 18 Nov 2004 || 4 || align=left | Disc.: Kitt Peak Obs.LoUTNOs, other TNO || 
|- id="2004 VN78" bgcolor=#C2E0FF
| E ||  || TNO || 8.0 || 119 km || single || 30 days || 11 Dec 2004 || 6 || align=left | Disc.: Kitt Peak Obs.LoUTNOs, plutino? || 
|- id="2004 VW78" bgcolor=#fefefe
| 0 ||  || MBA-I || 18.6 || data-sort-value="0.57" | 570 m || multiple || 2004–2020 || 27 Jan 2020 || 52 || align=left | Disc.: Spacewatch || 
|- id="2004 VE79" bgcolor=#d6d6d6
| 0 ||  || MBA-O || 17.2 || 2.0 km || multiple || 2004–2021 || 17 Jan 2021 || 45 || align=left | Disc.: SpacewatchAdded on 9 March 2021Alt.: 2014 SB204 || 
|- id="2004 VN79" bgcolor=#fefefe
| 2 ||  || MBA-I || 18.5 || data-sort-value="0.59" | 590 m || multiple || 2000–2012 || 21 Dec 2012 || 29 || align=left | Disc.: Spacewatch || 
|- id="2004 VS79" bgcolor=#fefefe
| 0 ||  || MBA-I || 17.5 || data-sort-value="0.94" | 940 m || multiple || 1995–2019 || 19 Dec 2019 || 113 || align=left | Disc.: Spacewatch || 
|- id="2004 VV79" bgcolor=#d6d6d6
| 3 ||  || MBA-O || 17.7 || 1.6 km || multiple || 2004–2020 || 27 Jan 2020 || 20 || align=left | Disc.: SpacewatchAdded on 17 June 2021 || 
|- id="2004 VZ79" bgcolor=#d6d6d6
| 2 ||  || MBA-O || 17.18 || 2.0 km || multiple || 2004–2021 || 06 Nov 2021 || 53 || align=left | Disc.: Spacewatch || 
|- id="2004 VG80" bgcolor=#d6d6d6
| 0 ||  || MBA-O || 16.72 || 2.5 km || multiple || 2003–2022 || 13 Jan 2022 || 159 || align=left | Disc.: SpacewatchAlt.: 2013 LP17, 2014 RZ38, 2015 XT272, 2018 HY2 || 
|- id="2004 VE81" bgcolor=#E9E9E9
| 0 ||  || MBA-M || 17.2 || 2.0 km || multiple || 2004–2021 || 12 Jun 2021 || 62 || align=left | Disc.: SpacewatchAdded on 22 July 2020 || 
|- id="2004 VF81" bgcolor=#E9E9E9
| 2 ||  || MBA-M || 17.8 || 1.5 km || multiple || 2004–2017 || 16 Aug 2017 || 33 || align=left | Disc.: Spacewatch || 
|- id="2004 VH81" bgcolor=#d6d6d6
| 0 ||  || MBA-O || 17.4 || 1.8 km || multiple || 2004–2021 || 23 Jan 2021 || 69 || align=left | Disc.: Spacewatch || 
|- id="2004 VN81" bgcolor=#E9E9E9
| 0 ||  || MBA-M || 16.35 || 1.6 km || multiple || 1996–2022 || 25 Jan 2022 || 234 || align=left | Disc.: LINEARAlt.: 1999 NT18, 2016 WE16 || 
|- id="2004 VV81" bgcolor=#fefefe
| 2 ||  || HUN || 19.3 || data-sort-value="0.41" | 410 m || multiple || 2004–2021 || 07 Jan 2021 || 74 || align=left | Disc.: LPL/Spacewatch IIAdded on 11 May 2021Alt.: 2012 US222 || 
|- id="2004 VD82" bgcolor=#fefefe
| 0 ||  || MBA-I || 19.37 || data-sort-value="0.40" | 400 m || multiple || 2004–2021 || 24 Nov 2021 || 60 || align=left | Disc.: SpacewatchAdded on 5 November 2021Alt.: 2014 OD268 || 
|- id="2004 VG82" bgcolor=#E9E9E9
| 0 ||  || MBA-M || 17.86 || 1.1 km || multiple || 2004–2022 || 06 Jan 2022 || 85 || align=left | Disc.: Kitt Peak Obs.Alt.: 2006 HC62 || 
|- id="2004 VV82" bgcolor=#E9E9E9
| 0 ||  || MBA-M || 17.93 || 1.1 km || multiple || 2000–2021 || 30 Nov 2021 || 87 || align=left | Disc.: SpacewatchAlt.: 2010 DE44 || 
|- id="2004 VW82" bgcolor=#d6d6d6
| 0 ||  || MBA-O || 16.41 || 2.9 km || multiple || 2004–2022 || 27 Jan 2022 || 155 || align=left | Disc.: SpacewatchAlt.: 2014 SG202 || 
|- id="2004 VX82" bgcolor=#fefefe
| 0 ||  || MBA-I || 18.05 || data-sort-value="0.73" | 730 m || multiple || 2000–2021 || 14 May 2021 || 79 || align=left | Disc.: Spacewatch || 
|- id="2004 VF83" bgcolor=#E9E9E9
| 0 ||  || MBA-M || 18.0 || 1.1 km || multiple || 2004–2021 || 28 Nov 2021 || 42 || align=left | Disc.: SpacewatchAdded on 29 January 2022 || 
|- id="2004 VN83" bgcolor=#fefefe
| 0 ||  || MBA-I || 18.71 || data-sort-value="0.54" | 540 m || multiple || 2004–2021 || 09 Oct 2021 || 38 || align=left | Disc.: SpacewatchAdded on 22 July 2020Alt.: 2016 GA144 || 
|- id="2004 VO83" bgcolor=#E9E9E9
| 0 ||  || MBA-M || 17.7 || 1.6 km || multiple || 2004–2020 || 20 Apr 2020 || 45 || align=left | Disc.: SpacewatchAdded on 24 December 2021 || 
|- id="2004 VV83" bgcolor=#d6d6d6
| 0 ||  || MBA-O || 17.1 || 2.1 km || multiple || 2004–2020 || 03 Jan 2020 || 45 || align=left | Disc.: SpacewatchAlt.: 2009 WE162 || 
|- id="2004 VX83" bgcolor=#fefefe
| 1 ||  || MBA-I || 18.3 || data-sort-value="0.65" | 650 m || multiple || 2003–2018 || 14 Dec 2018 || 91 || align=left | Disc.: SpacewatchAlt.: 2016 BP47 || 
|- id="2004 VZ83" bgcolor=#d6d6d6
| 0 ||  || MBA-O || 16.50 || 2.8 km || multiple || 2004–2022 || 25 Jan 2022 || 143 || align=left | Disc.: SpacewatchAlt.: 2015 XF188 || 
|- id="2004 VC84" bgcolor=#d6d6d6
| 0 ||  || HIL || 16.4 || 2.9 km || multiple || 2004–2021 || 04 Jan 2021 || 74 || align=left | Disc.: SpacewatchAdded on 22 July 2020Alt.: 2012 XR153 || 
|- id="2004 VJ84" bgcolor=#d6d6d6
| 0 ||  || MBA-O || 16.1 || 3.4 km || multiple || 2001–2021 || 11 Jun 2021 || 165 || align=left | Disc.: Spacewatch || 
|- id="2004 VC85" bgcolor=#d6d6d6
| 0 ||  || MBA-O || 16.6 || 2.7 km || multiple || 2004–2020 || 10 Nov 2020 || 79 || align=left | Disc.: Spacewatch || 
|- id="2004 VF86" bgcolor=#E9E9E9
| 0 ||  || MBA-M || 17.92 || 1.1 km || multiple || 2004–2021 || 09 Nov 2021 || 74 || align=left | Disc.: Spacewatch || 
|- id="2004 VW86" bgcolor=#d6d6d6
| 0 ||  || MBA-O || 17.7 || 1.6 km || multiple || 2004–2021 || 09 Jan 2021 || 107 || align=left | Disc.: SpacewatchAlt.: 2015 XY127 || 
|- id="2004 VE87" bgcolor=#E9E9E9
| 0 ||  || MBA-M || 17.4 || 1.8 km || multiple || 2004–2020 || 21 Mar 2020 || 68 || align=left | Disc.: SpacewatchAlt.: 2008 RS52 || 
|- id="2004 VJ87" bgcolor=#fefefe
| 0 ||  || MBA-I || 17.30 || 1.0 km || multiple || 1996–2021 || 09 Apr 2021 || 226 || align=left | Disc.: SpacewatchAlt.: 2008 YT13, 2012 VK64, 2015 TG13 || 
|- id="2004 VW87" bgcolor=#fefefe
| 0 ||  || MBA-I || 18.39 || data-sort-value="0.62" | 620 m || multiple || 2004–2021 || 20 Apr 2021 || 68 || align=left | Disc.: SpacewatchAlt.: 2011 PO6, 2015 TG321 || 
|- id="2004 VY87" bgcolor=#d6d6d6
| 0 ||  || MBA-O || 16.28 || 3.1 km || multiple || 2004–2022 || 22 Jan 2022 || 142 || align=left | Disc.: SpacewatchAlt.: 2017 DC55 || 
|- id="2004 VB88" bgcolor=#E9E9E9
| 2 ||  || MBA-M || 18.1 || data-sort-value="0.71" | 710 m || multiple || 2004–2020 || 09 Oct 2020 || 57 || align=left | Disc.: SpacewatchAlt.: 2012 TV156 || 
|- id="2004 VV88" bgcolor=#E9E9E9
| 0 ||  || MBA-M || 16.52 || 2.8 km || multiple || 1998–2021 || 09 Jul 2021 || 129 || align=left | Disc.: Spacewatch || 
|- id="2004 VG89" bgcolor=#E9E9E9
| 0 ||  || MBA-M || 17.87 || data-sort-value="0.79" | 790 m || multiple || 2004–2022 || 25 Jan 2022 || 56 || align=left | Disc.: Spacewatch || 
|- id="2004 VN89" bgcolor=#E9E9E9
| 3 ||  || MBA-M || 18.0 || data-sort-value="0.75" | 750 m || multiple || 1992–2020 || 08 Dec 2020 || 48 || align=left | Disc.: SpacewatchAdded on 9 March 2021Alt.: 2012 UJ121 || 
|- id="2004 VQ89" bgcolor=#fefefe
| 0 ||  || MBA-I || 18.1 || data-sort-value="0.71" | 710 m || multiple || 2002–2020 || 26 Feb 2020 || 79 || align=left | Disc.: SpacewatchAlt.: 2011 SW155 || 
|- id="2004 VS89" bgcolor=#E9E9E9
| 0 ||  || MBA-M || 17.93 || 1.1 km || multiple || 2004–2022 || 06 Jan 2022 || 41 || align=left | Disc.: SpacewatchAdded on 24 December 2021 || 
|- id="2004 VT89" bgcolor=#E9E9E9
| 0 ||  || MBA-M || 17.50 || 1.8 km || multiple || 2004–2021 || 13 Jul 2021 || 77 || align=left | Disc.: Spacewatch || 
|- id="2004 VU89" bgcolor=#fefefe
| 0 ||  || MBA-I || 18.4 || data-sort-value="0.62" | 620 m || multiple || 2004–2021 || 05 Jan 2021 || 80 || align=left | Disc.: SpacewatchAlt.: 2007 RD96, 2015 EX16 || 
|- id="2004 VZ89" bgcolor=#E9E9E9
| 1 ||  || MBA-M || 18.40 || data-sort-value="0.88" | 880 m || multiple || 2004–2021 || 08 Dec 2021 || 51 || align=left | Disc.: SpacewatchAdded on 24 December 2021 || 
|- id="2004 VA90" bgcolor=#d6d6d6
| 0 ||  || MBA-O || 16.7 || 2.5 km || multiple || 2004–2022 || 06 Jan 2022 || 142 || align=left | Disc.: SpacewatchAlt.: 2015 TR190 || 
|- id="2004 VD93" bgcolor=#fefefe
| 0 ||  || MBA-I || 18.71 || data-sort-value="0.54" | 540 m || multiple || 2004–2021 || 17 May 2021 || 151 || align=left | Disc.: Kitt Peak Obs.Alt.: 2011 SV98 || 
|- id="2004 VU93" bgcolor=#d6d6d6
| 0 ||  || MBA-O || 16.95 || 2.3 km || multiple || 1992–2021 || 30 Nov 2021 || 78 || align=left | Disc.: SpacewatchAdded on 24 December 2021 || 
|- id="2004 VG94" bgcolor=#d6d6d6
| 0 ||  || MBA-O || 17.10 || 2.1 km || multiple || 2004–2021 || 29 Nov 2021 || 70 || align=left | Disc.: Kitt Peak Obs.Added on 17 January 2021Alt.: 2014 QY87 || 
|- id="2004 VK94" bgcolor=#E9E9E9
| 0 ||  || MBA-M || 17.72 || 1.6 km || multiple || 2004–2021 || 13 Sep 2021 || 49 || align=left | Disc.: Kitt Peak Obs.Added on 22 July 2020 || 
|- id="2004 VN94" bgcolor=#d6d6d6
| 0 ||  || HIL || 16.4 || 2.9 km || multiple || 2004–2021 || 04 Jan 2021 || 52 || align=left | Disc.: Spacewatch || 
|- id="2004 VQ94" bgcolor=#fefefe
| 0 ||  || MBA-I || 18.3 || data-sort-value="0.65" | 650 m || multiple || 1998–2019 || 28 Dec 2019 || 77 || align=left | Disc.: SpacewatchAlt.: 2011 QP86, 2015 VC117 || 
|- id="2004 VX94" bgcolor=#d6d6d6
| 0 ||  || MBA-O || 16.2 || 3.2 km || multiple || 2004–2021 || 15 Jan 2021 || 145 || align=left | Disc.: SpacewatchAlt.: 2010 BH133 || 
|- id="2004 VG95" bgcolor=#d6d6d6
| 1 ||  || MBA-O || 17.5 || 1.8 km || multiple || 2004–2021 || 30 Nov 2021 || 41 || align=left | Disc.: Kitt Peak Obs.Added on 24 December 2021 || 
|- id="2004 VZ95" bgcolor=#d6d6d6
| 0 ||  || MBA-O || 16.51 || 2.8 km || multiple || 2004–2022 || 27 Jan 2022 || 97 || align=left | Disc.: SpacewatchAlt.: 2014 UQ87 || 
|- id="2004 VQ96" bgcolor=#fefefe
| 0 ||  || MBA-I || 18.5 || data-sort-value="0.59" | 590 m || multiple || 2004–2020 || 16 Oct 2020 || 86 || align=left | Disc.: SpacewatchAlt.: 2007 UJ38 || 
|- id="2004 VZ96" bgcolor=#d6d6d6
| 0 ||  || MBA-O || 16.0 || 3.5 km || multiple || 2004–2021 || 11 Jun 2021 || 106 || align=left | Disc.: LPL/Spacewatch II || 
|- id="2004 VP97" bgcolor=#E9E9E9
| 0 ||  || MBA-M || 18.32 || data-sort-value="0.91" | 910 m || multiple || 2004–2020 || 19 Apr 2020 || 28 || align=left | Disc.: Mauna Kea Obs.Added on 21 August 2021Alt.: 2019 AY39 || 
|- id="2004 VT97" bgcolor=#d6d6d6
| 1 ||  || MBA-O || 17.3 || 1.9 km || multiple || 1999–2019 || 25 Oct 2019 || 61 || align=left | Disc.: Mauna Kea Obs. || 
|- id="2004 VX97" bgcolor=#d6d6d6
| 0 ||  || MBA-O || 17.8 || 1.5 km || multiple || 2004–2020 || 25 Oct 2020 || 36 || align=left | Disc.: Mauna Kea Obs. || 
|- id="2004 VA98" bgcolor=#E9E9E9
| 0 ||  || MBA-M || 17.54 || 1.3 km || multiple || 2004–2021 || 27 Nov 2021 || 114 || align=left | Disc.: Mauna Kea Obs. || 
|- id="2004 VD98" bgcolor=#E9E9E9
| 0 ||  || MBA-M || 17.47 || 1.3 km || multiple || 1995–2021 || 09 Aug 2021 || 94 || align=left | Disc.: Mauna Kea Obs.Added on 22 July 2020Alt.: 2016 JO20 || 
|- id="2004 VJ98" bgcolor=#d6d6d6
| 0 ||  || MBA-O || 17.45 || 1.8 km || multiple || 2003–2021 || 26 Oct 2021 || 35 || align=left | Disc.: Mauna Kea Obs.Added on 19 October 2020 || 
|- id="2004 VQ98" bgcolor=#E9E9E9
| 0 ||  || MBA-M || 17.0 || 2.2 km || multiple || 2004–2020 || 17 Apr 2020 || 117 || align=left | Disc.: Mauna Kea Obs.Alt.: 2011 HM67, 2013 TH21 || 
|- id="2004 VT98" bgcolor=#d6d6d6
| 0 ||  || MBA-O || 17.58 || 1.7 km || multiple || 2004–2022 || 07 Jan 2022 || 60 || align=left | Disc.: Mauna Kea Obs. || 
|- id="2004 VX98" bgcolor=#fefefe
| 0 ||  || MBA-I || 18.7 || data-sort-value="0.54" | 540 m || multiple || 2002–2020 || 23 Jan 2020 || 41 || align=left | Disc.: Mauna Kea Obs. || 
|- id="2004 VE99" bgcolor=#d6d6d6
| 0 ||  || MBA-O || 17.7 || 1.6 km || multiple || 2004–2020 || 21 Oct 2020 || 54 || align=left | Disc.: Mauna Kea Obs. || 
|- id="2004 VF99" bgcolor=#E9E9E9
| 0 ||  || MBA-M || 18.41 || data-sort-value="0.87" | 870 m || multiple || 2004–2021 || 30 Oct 2021 || 37 || align=left | Disc.: Mauna Kea Obs. || 
|- id="2004 VO99" bgcolor=#fefefe
| 0 ||  || MBA-I || 18.1 || data-sort-value="0.71" | 710 m || multiple || 2004–2021 || 11 Jun 2021 || 98 || align=left | Disc.: Mauna Kea Obs.Alt.: 2006 BQ221 || 
|- id="2004 VP99" bgcolor=#E9E9E9
| 3 ||  || MBA-M || 18.6 || data-sort-value="0.57" | 570 m || multiple || 2004–2020 || 14 Nov 2020 || 37 || align=left | Disc.: Mauna Kea Obs.Added on 17 January 2021Alt.: 2012 UU74 || 
|- id="2004 VW99" bgcolor=#d6d6d6
| 0 ||  || MBA-O || 17.8 || 1.5 km || multiple || 2004–2020 || 10 Nov 2020 || 33 || align=left | Disc.: Mauna Kea Obs.Added on 19 October 2020Alt.: 2009 SM87 || 
|- id="2004 VY99" bgcolor=#fefefe
| 0 ||  || MBA-I || 17.8 || data-sort-value="0.82" | 820 m || multiple || 2004–2021 || 04 Oct 2021 || 138 || align=left | Disc.: Mauna Kea Obs.Added on 9 March 2021Alt.: 2009 AR60 || 
|- id="2004 VA100" bgcolor=#d6d6d6
| 0 ||  || MBA-O || 18.08 || 1.3 km || multiple || 2003–2021 || 07 Apr 2021 || 39 || align=left | Disc.: Mauna Kea Obs.Added on 22 July 2020 || 
|- id="2004 VC100" bgcolor=#fefefe
| 0 ||  || MBA-I || 19.02 || data-sort-value="0.47" | 470 m || multiple || 2004–2021 || 07 Apr 2021 || 52 || align=left | Disc.: Mauna Kea Obs. || 
|- id="2004 VO100" bgcolor=#fefefe
| 0 ||  || MBA-I || 18.73 || data-sort-value="0.53" | 530 m || multiple || 2004–2021 || 08 Aug 2021 || 31 || align=left | Disc.: Mauna Kea Obs.Added on 22 July 2020Alt.: 2011 UF215 || 
|- id="2004 VS100" bgcolor=#fefefe
| 0 ||  || MBA-I || 18.7 || data-sort-value="0.54" | 540 m || multiple || 2004–2020 || 20 Oct 2020 || 69 || align=left | Disc.: Mauna Kea Obs. || 
|- id="2004 VT100" bgcolor=#d6d6d6
| 2 ||  || MBA-O || 17.9 || 1.5 km || multiple || 2004–2020 || 22 Sep 2020 || 30 || align=left | Disc.: Mauna Kea Obs.Added on 17 January 2021 || 
|- id="2004 VY100" bgcolor=#d6d6d6
| – ||  || MBA-O || 17.7 || 1.6 km || single || 7 days || 10 Nov 2004 || 7 || align=left | Disc.: Mauna Kea Obs. || 
|- id="2004 VA101" bgcolor=#d6d6d6
| 0 ||  || MBA-O || 17.13 || 2.1 km || multiple || 2004–2021 || 07 Nov 2021 || 49 || align=left | Disc.: Mauna Kea Obs.Added on 22 July 2020 || 
|- id="2004 VB101" bgcolor=#d6d6d6
| 2 ||  || MBA-O || 18.2 || 1.3 km || multiple || 2004–2020 || 23 Sep 2020 || 35 || align=left | Disc.: Mauna Kea Obs.Added on 17 January 2021 || 
|- id="2004 VC101" bgcolor=#E9E9E9
| 0 ||  || MBA-M || 17.3 || 1.9 km || multiple || 2004–2020 || 22 Apr 2020 || 74 || align=left | Disc.: Mauna Kea Obs.Added on 22 July 2020Alt.: 2011 FB58 || 
|- id="2004 VG101" bgcolor=#fefefe
| 0 ||  || MBA-I || 18.0 || data-sort-value="0.75" | 750 m || multiple || 1999–2019 || 25 Sep 2019 || 86 || align=left | Disc.: Mauna Kea Obs. || 
|- id="2004 VP101" bgcolor=#fefefe
| 0 ||  || MBA-I || 18.73 || data-sort-value="0.53" | 530 m || multiple || 2003–2021 || 15 Jun 2021 || 114 || align=left | Disc.: Mauna Kea Obs.Added on 11 May 2021Alt.: 2021 GX54 || 
|- id="2004 VU101" bgcolor=#fefefe
| 0 ||  || MBA-I || 17.7 || data-sort-value="0.86" | 860 m || multiple || 2000–2019 || 02 Nov 2019 || 86 || align=left | Disc.: Mauna Kea Obs.Alt.: 2014 DF72 || 
|- id="2004 VW101" bgcolor=#d6d6d6
| – ||  || MBA-O || 18.0 || 1.4 km || single || 2 days || 11 Nov 2004 || 6 || align=left | Disc.: Mauna Kea Obs. || 
|- id="2004 VY101" bgcolor=#d6d6d6
| E ||  || MBA-O || 18.2 || 1.3 km || single || 2 days || 11 Nov 2004 || 6 || align=left | Disc.: Mauna Kea Obs. || 
|- id="2004 VA102" bgcolor=#d6d6d6
| 2 ||  || MBA-O || 17.9 || 1.5 km || multiple || 2004–2014 || 24 Jun 2014 || 13 || align=left | Disc.: Mauna Kea Obs.Added on 30 September 2021 || 
|- id="2004 VK102" bgcolor=#E9E9E9
| 0 ||  || MBA-M || 18.49 || data-sort-value="0.84" | 840 m || multiple || 2004–2021 || 11 Nov 2021 || 27 || align=left | Disc.: Mauna Kea Obs.Added on 17 June 2021Alt.: 2017 YE9 || 
|- id="2004 VM102" bgcolor=#d6d6d6
| 0 ||  || MBA-O || 17.3 || 1.9 km || multiple || 1999–2019 || 20 Sep 2019 || 62 || align=left | Disc.: Mauna Kea Obs. || 
|- id="2004 VQ102" bgcolor=#d6d6d6
| 0 ||  || MBA-O || 17.0 || 2.2 km || multiple || 2004–2019 || 01 Nov 2019 || 57 || align=left | Disc.: Mauna Kea Obs.Added on 22 July 2020 || 
|- id="2004 VU102" bgcolor=#E9E9E9
| 0 ||  || MBA-M || 18.09 || 1.0 km || multiple || 2004–2021 || 07 Nov 2021 || 91 || align=left | Disc.: Mauna Kea Obs.Added on 22 July 2020Alt.: 2012 QO42 || 
|- id="2004 VY102" bgcolor=#d6d6d6
| – ||  || MBA-O || 19.6 || data-sort-value="0.67" | 670 m || single || 2 days || 11 Nov 2004 || 6 || align=left | Disc.: Mauna Kea Obs. || 
|- id="2004 VD103" bgcolor=#fefefe
| 0 ||  || MBA-I || 17.8 || data-sort-value="0.82" | 820 m || multiple || 2004–2021 || 05 Jun 2021 || 122 || align=left | Disc.: Mauna Kea Obs.Alt.: 2010 GR141 || 
|- id="2004 VN103" bgcolor=#E9E9E9
| 0 ||  || MBA-M || 17.9 || 1.5 km || multiple || 2004–2021 || 30 Jul 2021 || 43 || align=left | Disc.: Mauna Kea Obs. || 
|- id="2004 VD104" bgcolor=#d6d6d6
| 0 ||  || HIL || 16.2 || 3.2 km || multiple || 2004–2021 || 06 Jan 2021 || 75 || align=left | Disc.: Mauna Kea Obs. || 
|- id="2004 VL104" bgcolor=#d6d6d6
| 4 ||  || MBA-O || 18.1 || 1.3 km || multiple || 2004–2020 || 05 Nov 2020 || 18 || align=left | Disc.: Mauna Kea Obs.Added on 11 May 2021 || 
|- id="2004 VN104" bgcolor=#fefefe
| 0 ||  || MBA-I || 17.9 || data-sort-value="0.78" | 780 m || multiple || 2003–2020 || 08 Dec 2020 || 96 || align=left | Disc.: Mauna Kea Obs. || 
|- id="2004 VQ104" bgcolor=#d6d6d6
| 0 ||  || MBA-O || 17.56 || 1.7 km || multiple || 2002–2021 || 13 May 2021 || 96 || align=left | Disc.: Mauna Kea Obs.Alt.: 2016 DE21 || 
|- id="2004 VR104" bgcolor=#E9E9E9
| 0 ||  || MBA-M || 17.7 || 1.6 km || multiple || 2002–2020 || 26 Feb 2020 || 56 || align=left | Disc.: Mauna Kea Obs. || 
|- id="2004 VS104" bgcolor=#d6d6d6
| 0 ||  || MBA-O || 17.05 || 2.2 km || multiple || 2004–2021 || 13 May 2021 || 120 || align=left | Disc.: Mauna Kea Obs.Alt.: 2009 WE189, 2016 EX185 || 
|- id="2004 VT104" bgcolor=#fefefe
| 0 ||  || MBA-I || 18.7 || data-sort-value="0.54" | 540 m || multiple || 2004–2020 || 21 Jun 2020 || 70 || align=left | Disc.: Mauna Kea Obs.Alt.: 2013 JD10 || 
|- id="2004 VA105" bgcolor=#E9E9E9
| 0 ||  || MBA-M || 18.04 || 1.0 km || multiple || 2004–2021 || 11 Oct 2021 || 32 || align=left | Disc.: Mauna Kea Obs. || 
|- id="2004 VJ105" bgcolor=#E9E9E9
| 0 ||  || MBA-M || 18.2 || 1.3 km || multiple || 2004–2015 || 25 Mar 2015 || 30 || align=left | Disc.: Mauna Kea Obs.Added on 21 August 2021Alt.: 2010 AB43 || 
|- id="2004 VK105" bgcolor=#d6d6d6
| 0 ||  || MBA-O || 16.9 || 2.3 km || multiple || 2004–2020 || 20 Oct 2020 || 76 || align=left | Disc.: Mauna Kea Obs. || 
|- id="2004 VM105" bgcolor=#E9E9E9
| 1 ||  || MBA-M || 17.8 || data-sort-value="0.82" | 820 m || multiple || 2004–2021 || 05 Jan 2021 || 84 || align=left | Disc.: Mauna Kea Obs. || 
|- id="2004 VT105" bgcolor=#E9E9E9
| 0 ||  || MBA-M || 16.84 || 2.4 km || multiple || 2002–2021 || 14 May 2021 || 154 || align=left | Disc.: Mauna Kea Obs.Alt.: 2009 YN26, 2016 GE152 || 
|- id="2004 VU105" bgcolor=#fefefe
| 0 ||  || MBA-I || 18.0 || data-sort-value="0.75" | 750 m || multiple || 2004–2021 || 12 Jan 2021 || 52 || align=left | Disc.: Mauna Kea Obs. || 
|- id="2004 VE106" bgcolor=#E9E9E9
| 2 ||  || MBA-M || 18.1 || data-sort-value="0.71" | 710 m || multiple || 2004–2020 || 17 Nov 2020 || 30 || align=left | Disc.: Mauna Kea Obs.Added on 22 July 2020Alt.: 2006 CA70 || 
|- id="2004 VG106" bgcolor=#E9E9E9
| 0 ||  || MBA-M || 18.53 || data-sort-value="0.58" | 580 m || multiple || 2002–2022 || 25 Jan 2022 || 18 || align=left | Disc.: Mauna Kea Obs.Added on 5 November 2021 || 
|- id="2004 VK106" bgcolor=#d6d6d6
| 1 ||  || MBA-O || 17.5 || 1.8 km || multiple || 2004–2020 || 12 Sep 2020 || 29 || align=left | Disc.: Mauna Kea Obs.Added on 21 August 2021Alt.: 2015 VH76 || 
|- id="2004 VM106" bgcolor=#E9E9E9
| 0 ||  || MBA-M || 17.89 || 1.5 km || multiple || 2004–2021 || 30 Jun 2021 || 52 || align=left | Disc.: Mauna Kea Obs. || 
|- id="2004 VW106" bgcolor=#E9E9E9
| 2 ||  || MBA-M || 18.5 || data-sort-value="0.84" | 840 m || multiple || 2004–2021 || 08 Sep 2021 || 26 || align=left | Disc.: Mauna Kea Obs.Added on 29 January 2022 || 
|- id="2004 VX106" bgcolor=#E9E9E9
| 4 ||  || MBA-M || 18.1 || 1.3 km || multiple || 2004–2020 || 22 Apr 2020 || 37 || align=left | Disc.: Mauna Kea Obs.Added on 21 August 2021Alt.: 2011 FV18, 2011 GR50 || 
|- id="2004 VY106" bgcolor=#E9E9E9
| 2 ||  || MBA-M || 18.4 || data-sort-value="0.88" | 880 m || multiple || 2004–2021 || 13 Sep 2021 || 22 || align=left | Disc.: Mauna Kea Obs.Added on 29 January 2022 || 
|- id="2004 VZ106" bgcolor=#E9E9E9
| 0 ||  || MBA-M || 16.83 || 2.4 km || multiple || 2004–2021 || 15 May 2021 || 131 || align=left | Disc.: Mauna Kea Obs.Alt.: 2009 WR212 || 
|- id="2004 VN107" bgcolor=#fefefe
| 2 ||  || MBA-I || 19.2 || data-sort-value="0.43" | 430 m || multiple || 2004–2020 || 29 Apr 2020 || 41 || align=left | Disc.: Mauna Kea Obs. || 
|- id="2004 VS107" bgcolor=#fefefe
| – ||  || MBA-I || 19.3 || data-sort-value="0.41" | 410 m || single || 23 days || 10 Nov 2004 || 6 || align=left | Disc.: Mauna Kea Obs. || 
|- id="2004 VV107" bgcolor=#E9E9E9
| 0 ||  || MBA-M || 18.17 || data-sort-value="0.69" | 690 m || multiple || 2004–2022 || 27 Jan 2022 || 53 || align=left | Disc.: Mauna Kea Obs.Added on 11 May 2021Alt.: 2008 US153, 2014 HM131 || 
|- id="2004 VX107" bgcolor=#E9E9E9
| 0 ||  || MBA-M || 17.9 || data-sort-value="0.78" | 780 m || multiple || 2004–2020 || 24 Sep 2020 || 56 || align=left | Disc.: Mauna Kea Obs.Added on 13 September 2020Alt.: 2007 GA67 || 
|- id="2004 VE108" bgcolor=#d6d6d6
| 1 ||  || MBA-O || 17.4 || 1.8 km || multiple || 2004–2020 || 14 Oct 2020 || 55 || align=left | Disc.: Mauna Kea Obs.Alt.: 2015 TN71 || 
|- id="2004 VJ108" bgcolor=#d6d6d6
| 0 ||  || MBA-O || 16.9 || 2.3 km || multiple || 2004–2021 || 30 Oct 2021 || 48 || align=left | Disc.: Mauna Kea Obs.Added on 5 November 2021 || 
|- id="2004 VO108" bgcolor=#d6d6d6
| 3 ||  || MBA-O || 18.14 || 1.3 km || multiple || 2004–2019 || 26 Sep 2019 || 20 || align=left | Disc.: Mauna Kea Obs.Added on 11 May 2021Alt.: 2019 RZ54 || 
|- id="2004 VQ108" bgcolor=#E9E9E9
| 3 ||  || MBA-M || 18.7 || data-sort-value="0.76" | 760 m || multiple || 2004–2021 || 07 Sep 2021 || 17 || align=left | Disc.: Mauna Kea Obs.Added on 30 September 2021 || 
|- id="2004 VU108" bgcolor=#d6d6d6
| 1 ||  || MBA-O || 17.3 || 1.9 km || multiple || 2004–2020 || 21 Oct 2020 || 31 || align=left | Disc.: Mauna Kea Obs.Added on 17 January 2021 || 
|- id="2004 VW108" bgcolor=#d6d6d6
| 2 ||  || MBA-O || 18.05 || 1.4 km || multiple || 2004–2021 || 11 Nov 2021 || 35 || align=left | Disc.: Mauna Kea Obs.Added on 22 July 2020 || 
|- id="2004 VX108" bgcolor=#d6d6d6
| – ||  || MBA-O || 17.0 || 2.2 km || single || 23 days || 10 Nov 2004 || 6 || align=left | Disc.: Mauna Kea Obs. || 
|- id="2004 VB109" bgcolor=#E9E9E9
| 0 ||  || MBA-M || 17.7 || 1.6 km || multiple || 2004–2017 || 22 Sep 2017 || 34 || align=left | Disc.: Mauna Kea Obs. || 
|- id="2004 VG109" bgcolor=#d6d6d6
| 0 ||  || MBA-O || 17.48 || 1.8 km || multiple || 2002–2021 || 08 Apr 2021 || 64 || align=left | Disc.: Mauna Kea Obs. || 
|- id="2004 VJ109" bgcolor=#d6d6d6
| 3 ||  || MBA-O || 17.5 || 1.8 km || multiple || 2004–2020 || 10 Dec 2020 || 19 || align=left | Disc.: Mauna Kea Obs.Added on 11 May 2021 || 
|- id="2004 VN109" bgcolor=#d6d6d6
| 0 ||  || MBA-O || 16.6 || 2.7 km || multiple || 2004–2020 || 16 Dec 2020 || 65 || align=left | Disc.: Mauna Kea Obs.Added on 22 July 2020 || 
|- id="2004 VG110" bgcolor=#E9E9E9
| – ||  || MBA-M || 18.5 || 1.1 km || single || 7 days || 10 Nov 2004 || 7 || align=left | Disc.: Mauna Kea Obs. || 
|- id="2004 VH110" bgcolor=#d6d6d6
| 1 ||  || MBA-O || 17.2 || 2.0 km || multiple || 2004–2020 || 15 Oct 2020 || 26 || align=left | Disc.: Mauna Kea Obs.Added on 22 July 2020 || 
|- id="2004 VL110" bgcolor=#fefefe
| 0 ||  || MBA-I || 18.15 || data-sort-value="0.70" | 700 m || multiple || 2004–2021 || 17 Apr 2021 || 51 || align=left | Disc.: Mauna Kea Obs. || 
|- id="2004 VM110" bgcolor=#E9E9E9
| 0 ||  || MBA-M || 17.7 || data-sort-value="0.86" | 860 m || multiple || 2003–2020 || 05 Nov 2020 || 79 || align=left | Disc.: Mauna Kea Obs.Alt.: 2011 FC87 || 
|- id="2004 VO111" bgcolor=#E9E9E9
| 0 ||  || MBA-M || 17.3 || 1.9 km || multiple || 2004–2020 || 27 Apr 2020 || 46 || align=left | Disc.: CSSAdded on 21 August 2021Alt.: 2010 GV88 || 
|- id="2004 VP112" bgcolor=#C7FF8F
| E ||  || CEN || 15.0 || 6.0 km || single || 1 day || 10 Nov 2004 || 4 || align=left | Disc.: Mauna Kea Obs. || 
|- id="2004 VB113" bgcolor=#E9E9E9
| 0 ||  || MBA-M || 18.2 || data-sort-value="0.68" | 680 m || multiple || 2004–2020 || 04 Sep 2020 || 54 || align=left | Disc.: Mauna Kea Obs.Added on 19 October 2020 || 
|- id="2004 VD113" bgcolor=#d6d6d6
| 0 ||  || MBA-O || 16.42 || 2.9 km || multiple || 2004–2021 || 28 Nov 2021 || 84 || align=left | Disc.: Mauna Kea Obs.Added on 17 June 2021Alt.: 2015 UR36 || 
|- id="2004 VK113" bgcolor=#E9E9E9
| 3 ||  || MBA-M || 18.9 || data-sort-value="0.70" | 700 m || multiple || 2004–2017 || 22 Nov 2017 || 13 || align=left | Disc.: Mauna Kea Obs. || 
|- id="2004 VM113" bgcolor=#d6d6d6
| 0 ||  || MBA-O || 17.1 || 2.1 km || multiple || 2004–2021 || 06 Jan 2021 || 48 || align=left | Disc.: Mauna Kea Obs.Alt.: 2007 HO98 || 
|- id="2004 VW113" bgcolor=#d6d6d6
| 0 ||  || MBA-O || 17.12 || 2.1 km || multiple || 2008–2021 || 11 Nov 2021 || 33 || align=left | Disc.: Mauna Kea Obs. || 
|- id="2004 VJ114" bgcolor=#fefefe
| 1 ||  || MBA-I || 19.31 || data-sort-value="0.41" | 410 m || multiple || 2004–2021 || 16 May 2021 || 31 || align=left | Disc.: Mauna Kea Obs.Added on 21 August 2021Alt.: 2021 HC9 || 
|- id="2004 VK114" bgcolor=#d6d6d6
| 4 ||  || MBA-O || 18.3 || 1.2 km || multiple || 2004–2020 || 15 Oct 2020 || 18 || align=left | Disc.: Mauna Kea Obs.Added on 17 June 2021Alt.: 2020 RS99 || 
|- id="2004 VL114" bgcolor=#d6d6d6
| 0 ||  || MBA-O || 17.1 || 2.1 km || multiple || 2002–2020 || 17 Nov 2020 || 65 || align=left | Disc.: Mauna Kea Obs. || 
|- id="2004 VT114" bgcolor=#E9E9E9
| 1 ||  || MBA-M || 18.8 || data-sort-value="0.52" | 520 m || multiple || 2004–2019 || 25 Jul 2019 || 20 || align=left | Disc.: Mauna Kea Obs. || 
|- id="2004 VN115" bgcolor=#d6d6d6
| 1 ||  || MBA-O || 17.9 || 1.5 km || multiple || 2002–2019 || 01 Nov 2019 || 54 || align=left | Disc.: Mauna Kea Obs. || 
|- id="2004 VH116" bgcolor=#fefefe
| 3 ||  || MBA-I || 18.5 || data-sort-value="0.59" | 590 m || multiple || 2004–2016 || 02 Apr 2016 || 21 || align=left | Disc.: Mauna Kea Obs.Alt.: 2014 UJ128 || 
|- id="2004 VL116" bgcolor=#fefefe
| 3 ||  || MBA-I || 19.0 || data-sort-value="0.47" | 470 m || multiple || 2004–2019 || 26 Sep 2019 || 21 || align=left | Disc.: Mauna Kea Obs.Added on 17 January 2021Alt.: 2015 OY132 || 
|- id="2004 VM117" bgcolor=#fefefe
| 2 ||  || MBA-I || 19.3 || data-sort-value="0.41" | 410 m || multiple || 2004–2019 || 28 Oct 2019 || 35 || align=left | Disc.: Mauna Kea Obs. || 
|- id="2004 VR117" bgcolor=#fefefe
| 0 ||  || MBA-I || 18.64 || data-sort-value="0.56" | 560 m || multiple || 2004–2021 || 08 May 2021 || 85 || align=left | Disc.: Mauna Kea Obs.Alt.: 2014 MJ33 || 
|- id="2004 VJ118" bgcolor=#E9E9E9
| 0 ||  || MBA-M || 18.3 || data-sort-value="0.65" | 650 m || multiple || 2004–2020 || 17 Oct 2020 || 50 || align=left | Disc.: Mauna Kea Obs. || 
|- id="2004 VO118" bgcolor=#fefefe
| 0 ||  || MBA-I || 19.39 || data-sort-value="0.39" | 390 m || multiple || 2011–2021 || 06 Nov 2021 || 78 || align=left | Disc.: Mauna Kea Obs.Added on 24 December 2021 || 
|- id="2004 VT118" bgcolor=#d6d6d6
| 0 ||  || MBA-O || 17.01 || 2.2 km || multiple || 2004–2022 || 07 Jan 2022 || 55 || align=left | Disc.: Mauna Kea Obs.Alt.: 2020 PD21 || 
|- id="2004 VG119" bgcolor=#d6d6d6
| – ||  || MBA-O || 20.3 || data-sort-value="0.48" | 480 m || single || 2 days || 11 Nov 2004 || 6 || align=left | Disc.: Mauna Kea Obs. || 
|- id="2004 VH119" bgcolor=#d6d6d6
| E ||  || MBA-O || 18.2 || 1.3 km || single || 2 days || 11 Nov 2004 || 6 || align=left | Disc.: Mauna Kea Obs. || 
|- id="2004 VJ119" bgcolor=#fefefe
| – ||  || MBA-I || 19.5 || data-sort-value="0.37" | 370 m || single || 2 days || 11 Nov 2004 || 6 || align=left | Disc.: Mauna Kea Obs. || 
|- id="2004 VM119" bgcolor=#FA8072
| E ||  || MCA || 21.1 || data-sort-value="0.18" | 180 m || single || 2 days || 11 Nov 2004 || 6 || align=left | Disc.: Mauna Kea Obs. || 
|- id="2004 VW119" bgcolor=#d6d6d6
| – ||  || MBA-O || 19.1 || data-sort-value="0.84" | 840 m || single || 2 days || 11 Nov 2004 || 6 || align=left | Disc.: Mauna Kea Obs. || 
|- id="2004 VY119" bgcolor=#d6d6d6
| 0 ||  || MBA-O || 17.3 || 1.9 km || multiple || 2004–2019 || 28 Oct 2019 || 48 || align=left | Disc.: Mauna Kea Obs.Alt.: 2010 AW152 || 
|- id="2004 VZ119" bgcolor=#fefefe
| 0 ||  || MBA-I || 17.96 || data-sort-value="0.76" | 760 m || multiple || 2004–2021 || 12 Jun 2021 || 275 || align=left | Disc.: Mauna Kea Obs. || 
|- id="2004 VA120" bgcolor=#fefefe
| 0 ||  || MBA-I || 19.0 || data-sort-value="0.47" | 470 m || multiple || 2004–2021 || 30 Nov 2021 || 61 || align=left | Disc.: Mauna Kea Obs.Added on 24 December 2021 || 
|- id="2004 VB120" bgcolor=#d6d6d6
| E ||  || MBA-O || 17.9 || 1.5 km || single || 2 days || 11 Nov 2004 || 6 || align=left | Disc.: Mauna Kea Obs. || 
|- id="2004 VC120" bgcolor=#fefefe
| 2 ||  || MBA-I || 18.4 || data-sort-value="0.62" | 620 m || multiple || 2004–2018 || 19 May 2018 || 25 || align=left | Disc.: Mauna Kea Obs.Alt.: 2014 GV12 || 
|- id="2004 VG120" bgcolor=#fefefe
| – ||  || MBA-I || 20.1 || data-sort-value="0.28" | 280 m || single || 2 days || 11 Nov 2004 || 6 || align=left | Disc.: Mauna Kea Obs. || 
|- id="2004 VO120" bgcolor=#fefefe
| 3 ||  || MBA-I || 18.9 || data-sort-value="0.49" | 490 m || multiple || 2004–2019 || 10 Jan 2019 || 28 || align=left | Disc.: Mauna Kea Obs.Alt.: 2011 WX26 || 
|- id="2004 VB121" bgcolor=#E9E9E9
| 3 ||  || MBA-M || 19.7 || data-sort-value="0.48" | 480 m || multiple || 2004–2021 || 08 Dec 2021 || 27 || align=left | Disc.: Mauna Kea Obs. || 
|- id="2004 VK121" bgcolor=#d6d6d6
| 2 ||  || MBA-O || 18.0 || 1.4 km || multiple || 2004–2021 || 14 May 2021 || 40 || align=left | Disc.: Mauna Kea Obs.Added on 30 September 2021Alt.: 2016 ED11 || 
|- id="2004 VL122" bgcolor=#fefefe
| 0 ||  || MBA-I || 18.1 || data-sort-value="0.71" | 710 m || multiple || 2004–2019 || 23 Aug 2019 || 34 || align=left | Disc.: Mauna Kea Obs.Alt.: 2014 EG88 || 
|- id="2004 VG123" bgcolor=#fefefe
| 2 ||  || MBA-I || 18.6 || data-sort-value="0.57" | 570 m || multiple || 2004–2019 || 04 Dec 2019 || 41 || align=left | Disc.: Mauna Kea Obs. || 
|- id="2004 VU123" bgcolor=#fefefe
| 0 ||  || MBA-I || 18.1 || data-sort-value="0.71" | 710 m || multiple || 2004–2019 || 21 Dec 2019 || 73 || align=left | Disc.: SpacewatchAlt.: 2004 TJ349 || 
|- id="2004 VW123" bgcolor=#E9E9E9
| – ||  || MBA-M || 18.7 || 1.0 km || single || 23 days || 10 Nov 2004 || 6 || align=left | Disc.: Mauna Kea Obs. || 
|- id="2004 VX124" bgcolor=#fefefe
| 2 ||  || MBA-I || 19.4 || data-sort-value="0.39" | 390 m || multiple || 2004–2020 || 15 May 2020 || 18 || align=left | Disc.: Mauna Kea Obs.Added on 21 August 2021 || 
|- id="2004 VW125" bgcolor=#fefefe
| 3 ||  || MBA-I || 19.4 || data-sort-value="0.39" | 390 m || multiple || 2004–2019 || 25 Sep 2019 || 25 || align=left | Disc.: Mauna Kea Obs.Added on 22 July 2020Alt.: 2015 PD68 || 
|- id="2004 VN126" bgcolor=#E9E9E9
| 0 ||  || MBA-M || 18.39 || data-sort-value="0.88" | 880 m || multiple || 2004–2020 || 23 Aug 2020 || 37 || align=left | Disc.: Mauna Kea Obs. || 
|- id="2004 VU126" bgcolor=#fefefe
| 2 ||  || MBA-I || 20.3 || data-sort-value="0.26" | 260 m || multiple || 2004–2017 || 16 Sep 2017 || 17 || align=left | Disc.: Mauna Kea Obs. || 
|- id="2004 VV127" bgcolor=#d6d6d6
| 1 ||  || MBA-O || 17.77 || 1.6 km || multiple || 2004–2022 || 25 Jan 2022 || 30 || align=left | Disc.: Mauna Kea Obs.Alt.: 2012 HO70 || 
|- id="2004 VW127" bgcolor=#E9E9E9
| 0 ||  || MBA-M || 18.4 || data-sort-value="0.62" | 620 m || multiple || 2004–2020 || 22 Sep 2020 || 43 || align=left | Disc.: Mauna Kea Obs.Added on 11 May 2021 || 
|- id="2004 VX127" bgcolor=#d6d6d6
| 1 ||  || MBA-O || 17.2 || 2.0 km || multiple || 2004–2020 || 23 Oct 2020 || 39 || align=left | Disc.: Mauna Kea Obs. || 
|- id="2004 VK128" bgcolor=#d6d6d6
| – ||  || HIL || 16.9 || 2.3 km || single || 23 days || 10 Nov 2004 || 6 || align=left | Disc.: Mauna Kea Obs. || 
|- id="2004 VL128" bgcolor=#d6d6d6
| – ||  || MBA-O || 17.1 || 2.1 km || single || 23 days || 10 Nov 2004 || 6 || align=left | Disc.: Mauna Kea Obs. || 
|- id="2004 VC129" bgcolor=#FA8072
| 3 ||  || MCA || 19.8 || data-sort-value="0.33" | 330 m || multiple || 2004–2015 || 07 Nov 2015 || 15 || align=left | Disc.: Mauna Kea Obs.Added on 29 January 2022 || 
|- id="2004 VH129" bgcolor=#fefefe
| 0 ||  || MBA-I || 18.6 || data-sort-value="0.57" | 570 m || multiple || 2003–2020 || 15 Dec 2020 || 87 || align=left | Disc.: SpacewatchAlt.: 2015 AG164 || 
|- id="2004 VJ129" bgcolor=#E9E9E9
| 1 ||  || MBA-M || 17.6 || 1.7 km || multiple || 2004–2019 || 09 Jan 2019 || 72 || align=left | Disc.: SpacewatchAlt.: 2010 HE18, 2015 FU321 || 
|- id="2004 VT129" bgcolor=#fefefe
| 0 ||  || MBA-I || 18.95 || data-sort-value="0.48" | 480 m || multiple || 2004–2022 || 06 Jan 2022 || 53 || align=left | Disc.: Mauna Kea Obs.Added on 22 July 2020 || 
|- id="2004 VA130" bgcolor=#E9E9E9
| 0 ||  || MBA-M || 18.37 || data-sort-value="0.89" | 890 m || multiple || 2004–2021 || 03 Oct 2021 || 37 || align=left | Disc.: Mauna Kea Obs.Added on 29 January 2022 || 
|- id="2004 VT130" bgcolor=#C7FF8F
| E ||  || CEN || 15.5 || 4.0 km || single || 1 day || 10 Nov 2004 || 4 || align=left | Disc.: Mauna Kea Obs. || 
|- id="2004 VU130" bgcolor=#C2E0FF
| 2 ||  || TNO || 6.9 || 151 km || multiple || 1999–2008 || 06 Dec 2008 || 26 || align=left | Disc.: Mauna Kea Obs.LoUTNOs, res1:3 || 
|- id="2004 VV130" bgcolor=#C2E0FF
| 1 ||  || TNO || 7.5 || 150 km || multiple || 2004–2021 || 11 Jan 2021 || 75 || align=left | Disc.: Mauna Kea Obs.LoUTNOs, plutino || 
|- id="2004 VX130" bgcolor=#C2E0FF
| 4 ||  || TNO || 7.71 || 136 km || multiple || 2004–2020 || 09 Dec 2020 || 22 || align=left | Disc.: Mauna Kea Obs.LoUTNOs, plutino || 
|- id="2004 VY130" bgcolor=#C2E0FF
| 1 ||  || TNO || 8.1 || 113 km || multiple || 2004–2017 || 20 Dec 2017 || 36 || align=left | Disc.: Mauna Kea Obs.LoUTNOs, plutino || 
|- id="2004 VZ130" bgcolor=#C2E0FF
| 3 ||  || TNO || 8.79 || 83 km || multiple || 2004–2021 || 11 Jan 2021 || 33 || align=left | Disc.: Mauna Kea Obs.LoUTNOs, plutino || 
|- id="2004 VD131" bgcolor=#C2E0FF
| 3 ||  || TNO || 6.60 || 159 km || multiple || 1999–2020 || 09 Dec 2020 || 34 || align=left | Disc.: Mauna Kea Obs.LoUTNOs, cubewano (cold) || 
|- id="2004 VE131" bgcolor=#C2E0FF
| 3 ||  || TNO || 7.6 || 109 km || multiple || 2004–2013 || 07 Oct 2013 || 16 || align=left | Disc.: Mauna Kea Obs.LoUTNOs, res3:5 || 
|- id="2004 VF131" bgcolor=#C2E0FF
| 2 ||  || TNO || 6.8 || 158 km || multiple || 1999–2009 || 19 Aug 2009 || 26 || align=left | Disc.: Mauna Kea Obs.LoUTNOs, res4:7 || 
|- id="2004 VG131" bgcolor=#C2E0FF
| 4 ||  || TNO || 8.39 || 79 km || multiple || 2004–2021 || 05 Nov 2021 || 17 || align=left | Disc.: Mauna Kea Obs.LoUTNOs, SDO || 
|- id="2004 VH131" bgcolor=#C2E0FF
| 2 ||  || TNO || 9.7 || 64 km || multiple || 2004–2007 || 12 Sep 2007 || 26 || align=left | Disc.: Mauna Kea Obs.LoUTNOs, centaur || 
|- id="2004 VM131" bgcolor=#C2E0FF
| 1 ||  || TNO || 8.4 || 116 km || multiple || 1999–2016 || 13 Mar 2016 || 34 || align=left | Disc.: Mauna Kea Obs.LoUTNOs, centaur || 
|- id="2004 VS131" bgcolor=#fefefe
| 0 ||  || MBA-I || 18.02 || data-sort-value="0.74" | 740 m || multiple || 2004–2021 || 11 Apr 2021 || 73 || align=left | Disc.: NEATAlt.: 2007 JS33, 2015 VP106 || 
|- id="2004 VU131" bgcolor=#C2E0FF
| 2 ||  || TNO || 7.4 || 110 km || multiple || 2004–2017 || 13 Dec 2017 || 44 || align=left | Disc.: Mauna Kea Obs.LoUTNOs, cubewano (cold) || 
|- id="2004 VX131" bgcolor=#E9E9E9
| 0 ||  || MBA-M || 17.67 || 1.2 km || multiple || 2004–2021 || 14 Sep 2021 || 107 || align=left | Disc.: LONEOS || 
|- id="2004 VY131" bgcolor=#d6d6d6
| 0 ||  || MBA-O || 16.60 || 2.7 km || multiple || 2004–2021 || 08 Nov 2021 || 140 || align=left | Disc.: Spacewatch || 
|- id="2004 VC132" bgcolor=#E9E9E9
| 0 ||  || MBA-M || 17.42 || 1.4 km || multiple || 2004–2021 || 31 Aug 2021 || 118 || align=left | Disc.: Spacewatch || 
|- id="2004 VD132" bgcolor=#fefefe
| 0 ||  || MBA-I || 17.9 || data-sort-value="0.78" | 780 m || multiple || 2004–2020 || 26 Jan 2020 || 82 || align=left | Disc.: Spacewatch || 
|- id="2004 VE132" bgcolor=#d6d6d6
| 0 ||  || MBA-O || 16.97 || 2.2 km || multiple || 2004–2021 || 13 May 2021 || 106 || align=left | Disc.: Spacewatch || 
|- id="2004 VG132" bgcolor=#fefefe
| 0 ||  || MBA-I || 17.1 || 1.1 km || multiple || 2004–2019 || 20 Dec 2019 || 80 || align=left | Disc.: CSS || 
|- id="2004 VJ132" bgcolor=#fefefe
| 0 ||  || MBA-I || 18.31 || data-sort-value="0.65" | 650 m || multiple || 2004–2021 || 14 Nov 2021 || 112 || align=left | Disc.: Spacewatch || 
|- id="2004 VK132" bgcolor=#E9E9E9
| 0 ||  || MBA-M || 17.4 || 1.4 km || multiple || 2004–2019 || 13 Jan 2019 || 71 || align=left | Disc.: LPL/Spacewatch II || 
|- id="2004 VL132" bgcolor=#fefefe
| 0 ||  || MBA-I || 17.93 || data-sort-value="0.77" | 770 m || multiple || 1993–2021 || 09 Jul 2021 || 84 || align=left | Disc.: Kitt Peak Obs. || 
|- id="2004 VM132" bgcolor=#E9E9E9
| 0 ||  || MBA-M || 17.75 || 1.2 km || multiple || 2004–2022 || 08 Jan 2022 || 114 || align=left | Disc.: Spacewatch || 
|- id="2004 VN132" bgcolor=#fefefe
| 1 ||  || HUN || 18.9 || data-sort-value="0.49" | 490 m || multiple || 2004–2021 || 22 Jan 2021 || 76 || align=left | Disc.: LPL/Spacewatch II || 
|- id="2004 VO132" bgcolor=#d6d6d6
| 0 ||  || MBA-O || 16.45 || 2.9 km || multiple || 2004–2022 || 11 Jan 2022 || 102 || align=left | Disc.: Spacewatch || 
|- id="2004 VP132" bgcolor=#d6d6d6
| 0 ||  || MBA-O || 16.2 || 3.2 km || multiple || 2004–2019 || 01 Nov 2019 || 81 || align=left | Disc.: Spacewatch || 
|- id="2004 VR132" bgcolor=#fefefe
| 0 ||  || MBA-I || 18.7 || data-sort-value="0.54" | 540 m || multiple || 2004–2018 || 13 Nov 2018 || 54 || align=left | Disc.: Spacewatch || 
|- id="2004 VS132" bgcolor=#E9E9E9
| 1 ||  || MBA-M || 18.4 || data-sort-value="0.62" | 620 m || multiple || 2004–2020 || 15 Dec 2020 || 126 || align=left | Disc.: Spacewatch || 
|- id="2004 VW132" bgcolor=#d6d6d6
| 0 ||  || MBA-O || 17.0 || 2.2 km || multiple || 2004–2020 || 23 Nov 2020 || 79 || align=left | Disc.: Spacewatch || 
|- id="2004 VX132" bgcolor=#d6d6d6
| 0 ||  || MBA-O || 16.08 || 3.4 km || multiple || 2004–2021 || 24 Nov 2021 || 104 || align=left | Disc.: Spacewatch || 
|- id="2004 VY132" bgcolor=#fefefe
| 0 ||  || MBA-I || 18.21 || data-sort-value="0.68" | 680 m || multiple || 2004–2021 || 25 Sep 2021 || 113 || align=left | Disc.: Kitt Peak Obs. || 
|- id="2004 VZ132" bgcolor=#E9E9E9
| 0 ||  || MBA-M || 17.1 || 2.1 km || multiple || 2004–2020 || 21 Apr 2020 || 64 || align=left | Disc.: Kitt Peak Obs. || 
|- id="2004 VA133" bgcolor=#fefefe
| 0 ||  || MBA-I || 18.04 || data-sort-value="0.73" | 730 m || multiple || 2004–2021 || 30 Jun 2021 || 45 || align=left | Disc.: LPL/Spacewatch II || 
|- id="2004 VB133" bgcolor=#fefefe
| 0 ||  || MBA-I || 17.89 || data-sort-value="0.79" | 790 m || multiple || 2004–2021 || 03 May 2021 || 103 || align=left | Disc.: Kitt Peak Obs. || 
|- id="2004 VC133" bgcolor=#E9E9E9
| 0 ||  || MBA-M || 17.6 || 1.7 km || multiple || 1995–2019 || 08 Jan 2019 || 48 || align=left | Disc.: Spacewatch || 
|- id="2004 VD133" bgcolor=#d6d6d6
| 0 ||  || MBA-O || 17.1 || 2.1 km || multiple || 2004–2017 || 03 Apr 2017 || 46 || align=left | Disc.: Kitt Peak Obs. || 
|- id="2004 VE133" bgcolor=#fefefe
| 0 ||  || MBA-I || 17.5 || data-sort-value="0.94" | 940 m || multiple || 1995–2021 || 18 Jan 2021 || 88 || align=left | Disc.: Spacewatch || 
|- id="2004 VF133" bgcolor=#fefefe
| 0 ||  || MBA-I || 18.12 || data-sort-value="0.71" | 710 m || multiple || 2004–2021 || 05 Oct 2021 || 95 || align=left | Disc.: Kitt Peak Obs. || 
|- id="2004 VG133" bgcolor=#fefefe
| 0 ||  || MBA-I || 18.6 || data-sort-value="0.57" | 570 m || multiple || 2004–2020 || 19 Oct 2020 || 101 || align=left | Disc.: Spacewatch || 
|- id="2004 VH133" bgcolor=#E9E9E9
| 0 ||  || MBA-M || 17.76 || 1.2 km || multiple || 2004–2021 || 10 Nov 2021 || 74 || align=left | Disc.: Spacewatch || 
|- id="2004 VK133" bgcolor=#fefefe
| 0 ||  || MBA-I || 18.4 || data-sort-value="0.62" | 620 m || multiple || 2004–2020 || 14 Sep 2020 || 53 || align=left | Disc.: Spacewatch || 
|- id="2004 VL133" bgcolor=#fefefe
| 0 ||  || HUN || 18.85 || data-sort-value="0.50" | 500 m || multiple || 2004–2021 || 03 May 2021 || 54 || align=left | Disc.: Spacewatch || 
|- id="2004 VN133" bgcolor=#E9E9E9
| 0 ||  || MBA-M || 16.7 || 2.5 km || multiple || 2004–2020 || 25 May 2020 || 104 || align=left | Disc.: Kitt Peak Obs.Alt.: 2010 GU92 || 
|- id="2004 VP133" bgcolor=#fefefe
| 0 ||  || HUN || 18.86 || data-sort-value="0.50" | 500 m || multiple || 2004–2021 || 09 May 2021 || 68 || align=left | Disc.: Spacewatch || 
|- id="2004 VV133" bgcolor=#E9E9E9
| 0 ||  || MBA-M || 17.94 || 1.1 km || multiple || 2004–2022 || 05 Jan 2022 || 59 || align=left | Disc.: Spacewatch || 
|- id="2004 VW133" bgcolor=#fefefe
| 0 ||  || MBA-I || 17.5 || data-sort-value="0.94" | 940 m || multiple || 2004–2021 || 24 Jan 2021 || 86 || align=left | Disc.: Spacewatch || 
|- id="2004 VX133" bgcolor=#E9E9E9
| 0 ||  || MBA-M || 17.09 || 2.1 km || multiple || 2004–2021 || 09 Jun 2021 || 78 || align=left | Disc.: Spacewatch || 
|- id="2004 VY133" bgcolor=#E9E9E9
| 0 ||  || MBA-M || 17.9 || 1.1 km || multiple || 2004–2016 || 19 Oct 2016 || 39 || align=left | Disc.: Kitt Peak Obs. || 
|- id="2004 VZ133" bgcolor=#fefefe
| 0 ||  || MBA-I || 18.1 || data-sort-value="0.71" | 710 m || multiple || 2004–2021 || 18 Jan 2021 || 53 || align=left | Disc.: Kitt Peak Obs. || 
|- id="2004 VB134" bgcolor=#fefefe
| 3 ||  || MBA-I || 18.7 || data-sort-value="0.54" | 540 m || multiple || 2004–2018 || 20 Oct 2018 || 36 || align=left | Disc.: Kitt Peak Obs. || 
|- id="2004 VD134" bgcolor=#E9E9E9
| 0 ||  || MBA-M || 17.1 || 1.6 km || multiple || 2004–2019 || 08 Apr 2019 || 41 || align=left | Disc.: Spacewatch || 
|- id="2004 VE134" bgcolor=#E9E9E9
| 0 ||  || MBA-M || 18.05 || 1.0 km || multiple || 2004–2021 || 04 Oct 2021 || 61 || align=left | Disc.: Spacewatch || 
|- id="2004 VF134" bgcolor=#E9E9E9
| 0 ||  || MBA-M || 17.64 || 1.7 km || multiple || 2004–2021 || 19 May 2021 || 47 || align=left | Disc.: Spacewatch || 
|- id="2004 VG134" bgcolor=#fefefe
| 0 ||  || MBA-I || 18.4 || data-sort-value="0.62" | 620 m || multiple || 2004–2020 || 22 Jan 2020 || 71 || align=left | Disc.: Spacewatch || 
|- id="2004 VJ134" bgcolor=#E9E9E9
| 0 ||  || MBA-M || 18.14 || data-sort-value="0.99" | 990 m || multiple || 2003–2021 || 04 Aug 2021 || 60 || align=left | Disc.: Spacewatch || 
|- id="2004 VK134" bgcolor=#E9E9E9
| 0 ||  || MBA-M || 17.32 || 1.9 km || multiple || 2004–2020 || 16 May 2020 || 52 || align=left | Disc.: Spacewatch || 
|- id="2004 VL134" bgcolor=#fefefe
| 0 ||  || MBA-I || 18.84 || data-sort-value="0.51" | 510 m || multiple || 2011–2021 || 03 May 2021 || 53 || align=left | Disc.: Mauna Kea Obs. || 
|- id="2004 VM134" bgcolor=#E9E9E9
| 0 ||  || MBA-M || 18.23 || data-sort-value="0.95" | 950 m || multiple || 2004–2021 || 08 Sep 2021 || 53 || align=left | Disc.: Spacewatch || 
|- id="2004 VN134" bgcolor=#fefefe
| 0 ||  || MBA-I || 18.14 || data-sort-value="0.70" | 700 m || multiple || 2004–2019 || 16 Dec 2019 || 79 || align=left | Disc.: Spacewatch || 
|- id="2004 VO134" bgcolor=#E9E9E9
| 0 ||  || MBA-M || 17.64 || 1.2 km || multiple || 2004–2021 || 28 Oct 2021 || 99 || align=left | Disc.: Spacewatch || 
|- id="2004 VP134" bgcolor=#fefefe
| 0 ||  || MBA-I || 18.4 || data-sort-value="0.62" | 620 m || multiple || 2004–2019 || 15 Nov 2019 || 82 || align=left | Disc.: LPL/Spacewatch II || 
|- id="2004 VR134" bgcolor=#d6d6d6
| 0 ||  || MBA-O || 17.02 || 2.2 km || multiple || 2004–2022 || 27 Jan 2022 || 60 || align=left | Disc.: SpacewatchAlt.: 2010 AB85 || 
|- id="2004 VT134" bgcolor=#fefefe
| 3 ||  || HUN || 19.2 || data-sort-value="0.43" | 430 m || multiple || 2004–2016 || 01 Jan 2016 || 20 || align=left | Disc.: Spacewatch || 
|- id="2004 VV134" bgcolor=#E9E9E9
| 0 ||  || MBA-M || 17.70 || 1.6 km || multiple || 2004–2021 || 03 Aug 2021 || 85 || align=left | Disc.: Spacewatch || 
|- id="2004 VW134" bgcolor=#E9E9E9
| 0 ||  || MBA-M || 17.0 || 2.2 km || multiple || 2004–2020 || 21 Apr 2020 || 100 || align=left | Disc.: Spacewatch || 
|- id="2004 VX134" bgcolor=#fefefe
| 0 ||  || MBA-I || 18.57 || data-sort-value="0.57" | 570 m || multiple || 2004–2021 || 15 Apr 2021 || 89 || align=left | Disc.: Kitt Peak Obs.Alt.: 2009 AJ16 || 
|- id="2004 VY134" bgcolor=#fefefe
| 0 ||  || MBA-I || 18.39 || data-sort-value="0.62" | 620 m || multiple || 2000–2019 || 28 Nov 2019 || 79 || align=left | Disc.: Berg. Gladbach || 
|- id="2004 VA135" bgcolor=#d6d6d6
| 0 ||  || MBA-O || 16.82 || 2.4 km || multiple || 2004–2021 || 09 May 2021 || 88 || align=left | Disc.: Spacewatch || 
|- id="2004 VB135" bgcolor=#d6d6d6
| 0 ||  || MBA-O || 17.05 || 2.2 km || multiple || 2004–2021 || 14 May 2021 || 93 || align=left | Disc.: Spacewatch || 
|- id="2004 VD135" bgcolor=#E9E9E9
| 0 ||  || MBA-M || 17.02 || 2.2 km || multiple || 2004–2021 || 08 Sep 2021 || 139 || align=left | Disc.: Spacewatch || 
|- id="2004 VE135" bgcolor=#E9E9E9
| 0 ||  || MBA-M || 17.2 || 2.0 km || multiple || 2004–2020 || 21 Mar 2020 || 67 || align=left | Disc.: LPL/Spacewatch II || 
|- id="2004 VF135" bgcolor=#d6d6d6
| 0 ||  || MBA-O || 16.4 || 2.9 km || multiple || 2004–2020 || 16 Dec 2020 || 129 || align=left | Disc.: Spacewatch || 
|- id="2004 VG135" bgcolor=#fefefe
| 0 ||  || MBA-I || 18.4 || data-sort-value="0.62" | 620 m || multiple || 2004–2019 || 28 Nov 2019 || 51 || align=left | Disc.: Spacewatch || 
|- id="2004 VH135" bgcolor=#fefefe
| 0 ||  || MBA-I || 18.0 || data-sort-value="0.75" | 750 m || multiple || 2004–2019 || 25 Sep 2019 || 56 || align=left | Disc.: Spacewatch || 
|- id="2004 VK135" bgcolor=#E9E9E9
| 0 ||  || MBA-M || 17.96 || 1.1 km || multiple || 1995–2021 || 14 Aug 2021 || 66 || align=left | Disc.: SpacewatchAlt.: 1995 WK10 || 
|- id="2004 VN135" bgcolor=#fefefe
| 0 ||  || MBA-I || 18.8 || data-sort-value="0.52" | 520 m || multiple || 2004–2019 || 28 Oct 2019 || 42 || align=left | Disc.: Spacewatch || 
|- id="2004 VO135" bgcolor=#E9E9E9
| 0 ||  || MBA-M || 17.8 || 1.5 km || multiple || 2004–2019 || 12 Feb 2019 || 69 || align=left | Disc.: Spacewatch || 
|- id="2004 VP135" bgcolor=#E9E9E9
| 0 ||  || MBA-M || 17.7 || 1.6 km || multiple || 1999–2018 || 13 Dec 2018 || 51 || align=left | Disc.: CSS || 
|- id="2004 VQ135" bgcolor=#fefefe
| 0 ||  || MBA-I || 18.31 || data-sort-value="0.65" | 650 m || multiple || 2004–2020 || 20 Apr 2020 || 55 || align=left | Disc.: CSS || 
|- id="2004 VS135" bgcolor=#fefefe
| 0 ||  || MBA-I || 18.7 || data-sort-value="0.54" | 540 m || multiple || 2004–2019 || 27 Oct 2019 || 45 || align=left | Disc.: Spacewatch || 
|- id="2004 VT135" bgcolor=#E9E9E9
| 0 ||  || MBA-M || 17.5 || 1.8 km || multiple || 2004–2019 || 02 Jan 2019 || 40 || align=left | Disc.: Spacewatch || 
|- id="2004 VU135" bgcolor=#fefefe
| 0 ||  || MBA-I || 18.75 || data-sort-value="0.53" | 530 m || multiple || 2004–2021 || 11 Jun 2021 || 54 || align=left | Disc.: Kitt Peak Obs. || 
|- id="2004 VV135" bgcolor=#E9E9E9
| 0 ||  || MBA-M || 17.5 || 1.8 km || multiple || 2004–2020 || 22 Apr 2020 || 48 || align=left | Disc.: Spacewatch || 
|- id="2004 VW135" bgcolor=#E9E9E9
| 0 ||  || MBA-M || 17.7 || 1.6 km || multiple || 2004–2020 || 22 Apr 2020 || 52 || align=left | Disc.: LPL/Spacewatch II || 
|- id="2004 VX135" bgcolor=#E9E9E9
| 0 ||  || MBA-M || 17.74 || 1.2 km || multiple || 2004–2021 || 09 Nov 2021 || 53 || align=left | Disc.: LPL/Spacewatch II || 
|- id="2004 VY135" bgcolor=#fefefe
| 0 ||  || MBA-I || 18.3 || data-sort-value="0.65" | 650 m || multiple || 2004–2021 || 05 Jan 2021 || 58 || align=left | Disc.: Spacewatch || 
|- id="2004 VZ135" bgcolor=#fefefe
| 0 ||  || MBA-I || 18.7 || data-sort-value="0.54" | 540 m || multiple || 2004–2020 || 17 Dec 2020 || 69 || align=left | Disc.: Kitt Peak Obs. || 
|- id="2004 VA136" bgcolor=#fefefe
| 1 ||  || MBA-I || 18.1 || data-sort-value="0.71" | 710 m || multiple || 1997–2020 || 28 Feb 2020 || 47 || align=left | Disc.: Spacewatch || 
|- id="2004 VB136" bgcolor=#fefefe
| 0 ||  || MBA-I || 18.8 || data-sort-value="0.52" | 520 m || multiple || 2004–2020 || 02 Feb 2020 || 64 || align=left | Disc.: Spacewatch || 
|- id="2004 VC136" bgcolor=#E9E9E9
| 0 ||  || MBA-M || 17.24 || 1.5 km || multiple || 2004–2021 || 27 Nov 2021 || 176 || align=left | Disc.: LONEOS || 
|- id="2004 VD136" bgcolor=#d6d6d6
| 2 ||  || MBA-O || 17.4 || 1.8 km || multiple || 2004–2021 || 17 Feb 2021 || 41 || align=left | Disc.: Kitt Peak Obs. || 
|- id="2004 VE136" bgcolor=#E9E9E9
| 0 ||  || MBA-M || 17.9 || 1.5 km || multiple || 2004–2017 || 19 Aug 2017 || 24 || align=left | Disc.: LPL/Spacewatch II || 
|- id="2004 VF136" bgcolor=#E9E9E9
| 0 ||  || MBA-M || 17.46 || 1.4 km || multiple || 2004–2021 || 07 Nov 2021 || 45 || align=left | Disc.: Spacewatch || 
|- id="2004 VJ136" bgcolor=#d6d6d6
| 0 ||  || MBA-O || 17.0 || 2.2 km || multiple || 2004–2021 || 04 Jan 2021 || 76 || align=left | Disc.: NEAT || 
|- id="2004 VK136" bgcolor=#E9E9E9
| 0 ||  || MBA-M || 17.3 || 1.9 km || multiple || 2004–2020 || 02 Feb 2020 || 53 || align=left | Disc.: Kitt Peak Obs. || 
|- id="2004 VL136" bgcolor=#fefefe
| 0 ||  || MBA-I || 18.02 || data-sort-value="0.74" | 740 m || multiple || 1993–2021 || 16 May 2021 || 153 || align=left | Disc.: Spacewatch || 
|- id="2004 VM136" bgcolor=#d6d6d6
| 0 ||  || MBA-O || 17.14 || 2.1 km || multiple || 2004–2022 || 25 Jan 2022 || 96 || align=left | Disc.: CSS || 
|- id="2004 VN136" bgcolor=#E9E9E9
| 0 ||  || MBA-M || 18.43 || data-sort-value="0.87" | 870 m || multiple || 2004–2021 || 11 Nov 2021 || 52 || align=left | Disc.: Kitt Peak Obs. || 
|- id="2004 VO136" bgcolor=#E9E9E9
| 0 ||  || MBA-M || 17.45 || 1.8 km || multiple || 2004–2021 || 05 Jul 2021 || 81 || align=left | Disc.: Spacewatch || 
|- id="2004 VQ136" bgcolor=#d6d6d6
| 0 ||  || MBA-O || 17.6 || 1.7 km || multiple || 2004–2019 || 28 Aug 2019 || 41 || align=left | Disc.: Kitt Peak Obs. || 
|- id="2004 VR136" bgcolor=#d6d6d6
| 0 ||  || MBA-O || 16.7 || 2.5 km || multiple || 2004–2020 || 08 Dec 2020 || 101 || align=left | Disc.: Spacewatch || 
|- id="2004 VS136" bgcolor=#fefefe
| 1 ||  || MBA-I || 17.8 || data-sort-value="0.82" | 820 m || multiple || 2004–2019 || 06 Sep 2019 || 41 || align=left | Disc.: Kitt Peak Obs. || 
|- id="2004 VU136" bgcolor=#fefefe
| 0 ||  || MBA-I || 18.6 || data-sort-value="0.57" | 570 m || multiple || 2004–2018 || 12 Jul 2018 || 44 || align=left | Disc.: Spacewatch || 
|- id="2004 VV136" bgcolor=#fefefe
| 1 ||  || MBA-I || 18.9 || data-sort-value="0.49" | 490 m || multiple || 2004–2019 || 27 Oct 2019 || 30 || align=left | Disc.: Kitt Peak Obs. || 
|- id="2004 VW136" bgcolor=#E9E9E9
| 1 ||  || MBA-M || 18.4 || data-sort-value="0.62" | 620 m || multiple || 2004–2020 || 15 Oct 2020 || 46 || align=left | Disc.: Mauna Kea Obs. || 
|- id="2004 VX136" bgcolor=#d6d6d6
| 1 ||  || MBA-O || 16.8 || 2.4 km || multiple || 2004–2020 || 14 Dec 2020 || 41 || align=left | Disc.: SpacewatchAlt.: 2010 BE110 || 
|- id="2004 VZ136" bgcolor=#E9E9E9
| 0 ||  || MBA-M || 17.1 || 2.1 km || multiple || 2004–2021 || 08 Jun 2021 || 48 || align=left | Disc.: CSS || 
|- id="2004 VA137" bgcolor=#E9E9E9
| 0 ||  || MBA-M || 17.83 || 1.1 km || multiple || 2004–2021 || 03 Oct 2021 || 41 || align=left | Disc.: Spacewatch || 
|- id="2004 VB137" bgcolor=#E9E9E9
| 0 ||  || MBA-M || 18.3 || 1.2 km || multiple || 2004–2019 || 08 Feb 2019 || 30 || align=left | Disc.: Spacewatch || 
|- id="2004 VC137" bgcolor=#d6d6d6
| 0 ||  || MBA-O || 16.8 || 2.4 km || multiple || 2002–2020 || 19 Nov 2020 || 59 || align=left | Disc.: Kitt Peak Obs. || 
|- id="2004 VD137" bgcolor=#d6d6d6
| 0 ||  || MBA-O || 17.14 || 2.1 km || multiple || 2004–2021 || 11 Jun 2021 || 78 || align=left | Disc.: SpacewatchAlt.: 2010 DB63 || 
|- id="2004 VE137" bgcolor=#d6d6d6
| 0 ||  || MBA-O || 16.8 || 2.4 km || multiple || 2004–2020 || 15 Dec 2020 || 164 || align=left | Disc.: Spacewatch || 
|- id="2004 VG137" bgcolor=#d6d6d6
| 1 ||  || MBA-O || 17.43 || 1.8 km || multiple || 2004–2021 || 15 Apr 2021 || 76 || align=left | Disc.: Kitt Peak Obs. || 
|- id="2004 VH137" bgcolor=#d6d6d6
| 2 ||  || MBA-O || 17.5 || 1.8 km || multiple || 2004–2021 || 12 Jan 2021 || 41 || align=left | Disc.: Kitt Peak Obs. || 
|- id="2004 VJ137" bgcolor=#fefefe
| 0 ||  || MBA-I || 18.6 || data-sort-value="0.57" | 570 m || multiple || 2004–2019 || 04 Dec 2019 || 50 || align=left | Disc.: Spacewatch || 
|- id="2004 VK137" bgcolor=#fefefe
| 0 ||  || MBA-I || 18.72 || data-sort-value="0.54" | 540 m || multiple || 2002–2021 || 08 May 2021 || 58 || align=left | Disc.: Kitt Peak Obs. || 
|- id="2004 VL137" bgcolor=#fefefe
| 1 ||  || MBA-I || 18.7 || data-sort-value="0.54" | 540 m || multiple || 2004–2019 || 03 Dec 2019 || 27 || align=left | Disc.: Spacewatch || 
|- id="2004 VM137" bgcolor=#fefefe
| 0 ||  || MBA-I || 18.83 || data-sort-value="0.51" | 510 m || multiple || 2004–2021 || 06 Nov 2021 || 53 || align=left | Disc.: Spacewatch || 
|- id="2004 VN137" bgcolor=#fefefe
| 0 ||  || MBA-I || 18.30 || data-sort-value="0.65" | 650 m || multiple || 2004–2021 || 17 Apr 2021 || 60 || align=left | Disc.: Spacewatch || 
|- id="2004 VR137" bgcolor=#fefefe
| 1 ||  || MBA-I || 18.9 || data-sort-value="0.49" | 490 m || multiple || 2004–2019 || 28 Oct 2019 || 41 || align=left | Disc.: Kitt Peak Obs. || 
|- id="2004 VS137" bgcolor=#fefefe
| 0 ||  || MBA-I || 18.64 || data-sort-value="0.56" | 560 m || multiple || 2004–2021 || 09 May 2021 || 69 || align=left | Disc.: Spacewatch || 
|- id="2004 VT137" bgcolor=#d6d6d6
| 0 ||  || MBA-O || 16.50 || 2.8 km || multiple || 2004–2022 || 27 Jan 2022 || 91 || align=left | Disc.: CSS || 
|- id="2004 VU137" bgcolor=#fefefe
| 2 ||  || MBA-I || 18.6 || data-sort-value="0.57" | 570 m || multiple || 2004–2019 || 29 Sep 2019 || 21 || align=left | Disc.: Kitt Peak Obs. || 
|- id="2004 VV137" bgcolor=#E9E9E9
| 0 ||  || MBA-M || 17.1 || 2.1 km || multiple || 2004–2020 || 10 Jun 2020 || 43 || align=left | Disc.: Spacewatch || 
|- id="2004 VW137" bgcolor=#fefefe
| 0 ||  || MBA-I || 18.81 || data-sort-value="0.51" | 510 m || multiple || 2004–2021 || 10 Aug 2021 || 26 || align=left | Disc.: MLSAdded on 22 July 2020 || 
|- id="2004 VX137" bgcolor=#fefefe
| 0 ||  || MBA-I || 19.0 || data-sort-value="0.47" | 470 m || multiple || 2004–2017 || 18 Mar 2017 || 26 || align=left | Disc.: Pan-STARRSAdded on 22 July 2020 || 
|- id="2004 VY137" bgcolor=#E9E9E9
| 0 ||  || MBA-M || 17.76 || 1.2 km || multiple || 2004–2021 || 09 Nov 2021 || 92 || align=left | Disc.: Kitt Peak Obs.Added on 22 July 2020 || 
|- id="2004 VZ137" bgcolor=#fefefe
| 0 ||  || MBA-I || 18.28 || data-sort-value="0.66" | 660 m || multiple || 2004–2021 || 27 Nov 2021 || 92 || align=left | Disc.: SpacewatchAdded on 19 October 2020 || 
|- id="2004 VC138" bgcolor=#d6d6d6
| 0 ||  || MBA-O || 17.3 || 1.9 km || multiple || 2004–2020 || 23 Nov 2020 || 62 || align=left | Disc.: SpacewatchAdded on 17 January 2021 || 
|- id="2004 VF138" bgcolor=#d6d6d6
| 0 ||  || MBA-O || 17.2 || 2.0 km || multiple || 2004–2020 || 13 Sep 2020 || 24 || align=left | Disc.: Pan-STARRS 1Added on 11 May 2021 || 
|- id="2004 VG138" bgcolor=#fefefe
| 1 ||  || MBA-I || 18.0 || data-sort-value="0.75" | 750 m || multiple || 1996–2021 || 05 Feb 2021 || 52 || align=left | Disc.: SpacewatchAdded on 11 May 2021Alt.: 2020 YD11 || 
|- id="2004 VJ138" bgcolor=#d6d6d6
| 0 ||  || MBA-O || 17.0 || 2.2 km || multiple || 2004–2021 || 03 May 2021 || 40 || align=left | Disc.: SpacewatchAdded on 21 August 2021Alt.: 2009 WT79 || 
|- id="2004 VK138" bgcolor=#FA8072
| 2 ||  || MCA || 18.9 || data-sort-value="0.49" | 490 m || multiple || 2004–2021 || 10 Feb 2021 || 27 || align=left | Disc.: SpacewatchAdded on 21 August 2021 || 
|- id="2004 VL138" bgcolor=#d6d6d6
| 0 ||  || MBA-O || 16.59 || 2.7 km || multiple || 2004–2021 || 08 Sep 2021 || 52 || align=left | Disc.: SpacewatchAdded on 21 August 2021 || 
|- id="2004 VM138" bgcolor=#E9E9E9
| 0 ||  || MBA-M || 18.04 || 1.0 km || multiple || 1991–2021 || 25 Nov 2021 || 74 || align=left | Disc.: SpacewatchAdded on 21 August 2021 || 
|- id="2004 VN138" bgcolor=#d6d6d6
| 0 ||  || HIL || 16.87 || 2.4 km || multiple || 2004–2021 || 18 Jan 2021 || 38 || align=left | Disc.: SpacewatchAdded on 30 September 2021 || 
|- id="2004 VP138" bgcolor=#d6d6d6
| 0 ||  || MBA-O || 18.11 || 1.3 km || multiple || 1998–2021 || 30 Oct 2021 || 40 || align=left | Disc.: Pan-STARRSAdded on 5 November 2021 || 
|- id="2004 VQ138" bgcolor=#E9E9E9
| 1 ||  || MBA-M || 18.95 || data-sort-value="0.68" | 680 m || multiple || 2004–2021 || 07 Nov 2021 || 25 || align=left | Disc.: Pan-STARRSAdded on 5 November 2021 || 
|- id="2004 VR138" bgcolor=#d6d6d6
| 0 ||  || MBA-O || 17.3 || 1.9 km || multiple || 2004–2021 || 05 Oct 2021 || 31 || align=left | Disc.: Pan-STARRSAdded on 5 November 2021 || 
|- id="2004 VS138" bgcolor=#d6d6d6
| 0 ||  || MBA-O || 17.04 || 2.2 km || multiple || 2000–2022 || 06 Jan 2022 || 85 || align=left | Disc.: SpacewatchAdded on 5 November 2021 || 
|- id="2004 VT138" bgcolor=#d6d6d6
| 0 ||  || MBA-O || 17.27 || 2.0 km || multiple || 2004–2021 || 30 Nov 2021 || 72 || align=left | Disc.: SpacewatchAdded on 24 December 2021 || 
|- id="2004 VU138" bgcolor=#E9E9E9
| 0 ||  || MBA-M || 18.72 || data-sort-value="0.76" | 760 m || multiple || 2004–2021 || 09 Dec 2021 || 56 || align=left | Disc.: SpacewatchAdded on 24 December 2021 || 
|- id="2004 VV138" bgcolor=#d6d6d6
| 0 ||  || MBA-O || 17.15 || 2.1 km || multiple || 2004–2021 || 09 Dec 2021 || 61 || align=left | Disc.: SpacewatchAdded on 24 December 2021 || 
|- id="2004 VW138" bgcolor=#E9E9E9
| 1 ||  || MBA-M || 18.50 || data-sort-value="0.84" | 840 m || multiple || 2004–2021 || 09 Nov 2021 || 30 || align=left | Disc.: Kitt Peak Obs.Added on 24 December 2021 || 
|- id="2004 VX138" bgcolor=#E9E9E9
| 0 ||  || MBA-M || 17.83 || data-sort-value="0.81" | 810 m || multiple || 2004–2022 || 25 Jan 2022 || 34 || align=left | Disc.: Pan-STARRSAdded on 24 December 2021 || 
|- id="2004 VY138" bgcolor=#E9E9E9
| 1 ||  || MBA-M || 17.90 || 1.1 km || multiple || 2004–2021 || 09 Dec 2021 || 42 || align=left | Disc.: SpacewatchAdded on 24 December 2021 || 
|}
back to top

References 
 

Lists of unnumbered minor planets